= 4th South Midland Brigade, Royal Field Artillery =

IV South Midland Brigade, Royal Field Artillery
- Cap badge of the Royal Regiment of Artillery
- Active: 12 May 1908–1919
- Country: United Kingdom
- Branch: Territorial Force
- Role: Field artillery
- Size: 2–4 Batteries
- Part of: 48th (South Midland) Division; 61st (2nd South Midland) Division
- Garrison/HQ: Coventry
- Engagements: Battle of the Somme; Attack at Fromelles

The IV South Midland Brigade (4th South Midland Brigade) (Note: In Royal Artillery terminology, a 'brigade' was a group of independent batteries grouped together for administrative rather than tactical purposes, the officer in command normally being a lieutenant-colonel rather than a brigadier-general or major-general, the ranks usually associated with command of an infantry or cavalry brigade.) of the Royal Field Artillery (RFA) was a unit of Britain's Territorial Force (TF) from 1908 to 1919. Recruited from Warwickshire, it served on the Western Front during World War I, when it was broken up to reinforce other units.

== Origin ==
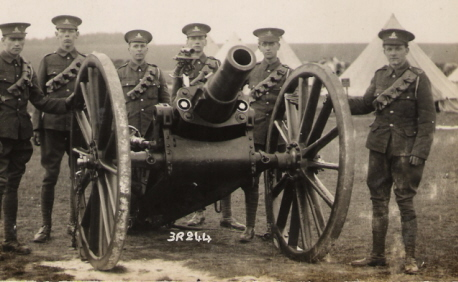
BL 5-inch howitzer and TF gunners in camp before World War I

When the Territorial Force was created from the former Volunteer Force under the Haldane Reforms in 1908, IV South Midland Brigade was one of the new artillery units raised to support the South Midland Division. Formed from part of the Birmingham-based 1st Warwickshire Royal Garrison Artillery (Volunteers) on 12 May 1908, it had two batteries, each with four 5-inch howitzers, giving the following organisation: (Note: Frederick lists the Derbyshire batteries of IV North Midland Bde by mistake.) (Note: Within the unit the two batteries were known as the Coventry and Rugby batteries respectively.)

IV South Midland (Howitzer) Brigade

- Brigade HQ: Quinton Road and Artillery Barracks, Smithford Street, Coventry
- 4th Warwickshire (Howitzer) Battery, Quinton Road
- 5th Warwickshire (Howitzer) Battery, temporarily at Rugby
- 4th South Midland (Howitzer) Ammunition Column, Quinton Road

== World War I ==
=== Mobilisation ===
The units of the South Midland Division had only just departed for their annual summer camp, with IV SM Brigade at Lydd, when emergency orders recalled them to their drill halls. All units were mobilised for full time war service on 5 August 1914 and went to their war stations, IV SM Bde going to Swindon on 12 August. By mid-August the division had concentrated in the Chelmsford area of Essex as part of Central Force, with IV SM (H) Bde at Great Baddow. On mobilisation IV SM (H) Bde was commanded by a regular officer, Major A.M.R. Mallock, who had held a temporary commission of lieutenant-colonel in the TF since 1910. When he fell sick in August, Maj Frank West, officer commanding 4th Warwickshire Bty, took over command of the brigade and was later promoted to Temporary Lt-Col, backdated to 4 August 1914.

On 10 August, TF units were invited to volunteer for Overseas Service. On 15 August 1914, the WO issued instructions to separate those men who had opted for Home Service only, and form these into reserve units. On 31 August, the formation of a reserve or 2nd Line unit was authorised for each 1st Line unit where 60 per cent or more of the men had volunteered for Overseas Service. The titles of these 2nd Line units would be the same as the original, but distinguished by a '2/' prefix and would absorb the flood of volunteers coming forwards. In this way duplicate batteries, brigades and divisions were created, mirroring those TF formations being sent overseas.

=== 1/IV South Midland Brigade ===
==== Western Front ====
The training of 1st South Midland Division proceeded satisfactorily, and it was selected for service on the Western Front. Orders arrived on 13 March 1915 and 1/IV South Midland Bde under Lt-Col West sailed from Southampton to land at Le Havre on 31 March. By 3 April the division had concentrated near Cassel, and 1/IV SM (H) Bde was preparing to take over gun positions from 1/IV North Midland (H) Bde of 46th (North Midland) Division at Petit Pont. The brigade was supporting the experienced 4th Division. At the request of an infantry unit, the brigade fired its first rounds at Le Petit Douve Farm on 6 April, and 1/5th Warwickshire Bty's observation posts (OPs) at 'Spy House' and Le Hutte Cheateau came under shellfire next day. The brigade then settled into the routine of trench warfare, registering its guns on likely targets and firing retaliatory barrages on prepared 'SOS' lines. On 18 April the brigade shifted position to La Mennegatte behind 48th (SM) Division facing the Messines Ridge. It handed over its previous gun positions and billets to 1/III SM Bde, but left 1/4th Warwickshire Bty under command of 4th Division.

Routine activities continued, though firing was restricted by shortage of ammunition for the 5-inch howitzers. With only 1/5th Warwickshire Bty to command, Bde HQ moved to Ploegsteert ('Plugstreet') in May to be closer to it. HQ spent its time reconnoitring alternative gun positions in case of emergency. On 6 June the Royal Engineers exploded a mine beneath the German trenches at 'The Birdcage', and 1/5th Warwickshire Bty fired in support of the operation, dispersing a German working party attempting to repair the damage. The Germans retaliated with their own mine on 14 June, accompanied by a heavy bombardment of Plugstreet Wood, destroying all the telephone lines except that of 1/IV SM (H) Bde HQ. 1/4th Warwickshire Bty rejoined the brigade in Plugstreet Wood on 20–21 June, then on 26 June the brigade was relieved by a Canadian unit and marched with 144th (Gloucester & Worcester) Infantry Brigade Group to Ferfay for three weeks' rest and training.

On 19 July the brigade entrained for Thièvres in the Somme sector, where HQ was stablished at Authie and the batteries dug positions in Hébuterne Wood. 1/4th Warwickshire Bty registered its guns, but 1/5th Bty was ordered to remain silent, only opening fire on 8 August. The usual targets were German trenches and Minenwerfer positions around Gommecourt Wood and Serre, and Hébuterne Wood was frequently shelled in return. This routine continued until 24 November when 1/4th Bty was relieved by 1/10th London (H) Bty and went to rest. Early on 26 November 48th (SM) Divisional Artillery (DA) supported a trench raid carried out by 6th Battalion, Gloucestershire Regiment. 1/10th London Bty left on 4 December when 1/4th Warwickshire Bty returned to the line. The well-emplaced German minenwerfers were proving troublesome, and while the rest of the battery worked on reserve positions at Foncquevillers, one 'roving' gun of 1/5th Bty was placed near the Sailly–Foncquevillers road from 11 to 26 December to 'snipe' at a minenwerfer positioned north of Gommecourt Wood.

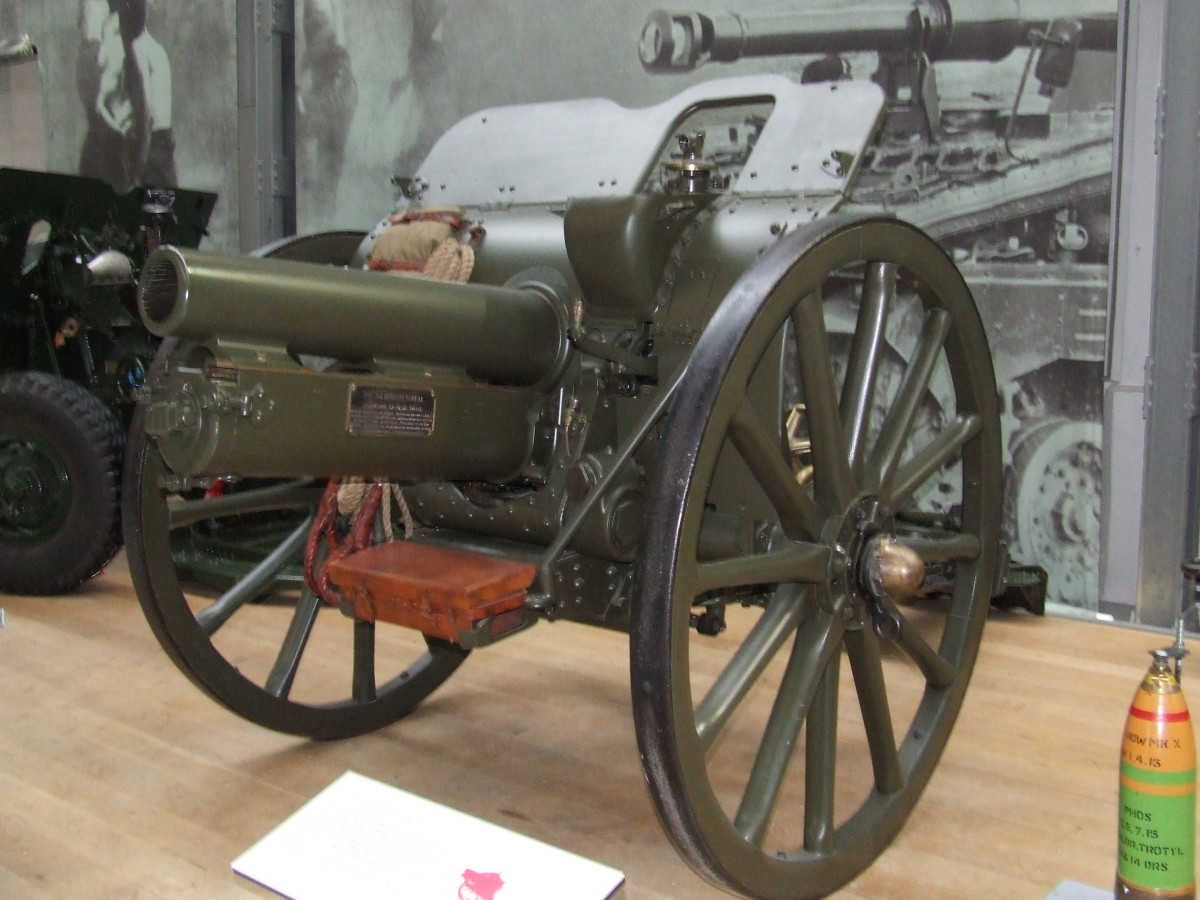
4.5-inch howitzer at the Royal Artillery Museum.

On 6 January 1916 the brigade received modern 4.5-inch howitzers in place of its old 5-inch weapons, and on 7 February it was joined by D (H) Bty from CXXVI Bde of 37th Division, a 'Kitchener's Army' unit, which brought the brigade up to a strength of three batteries. It moved into 48th (SM) DA's area on 2 March when the brigade shuffled its gun positions. The trench routine continued, with occasional raids on both sides. At one point active German anti-aircraft guns were driven off by 1/4th Bty.

==== Reorganisation ====
Between 6 and 11 May 48th (SM) Division was relieved in the line by 56th (1/1st London) Division and 1/IV SM (H) Bde went to Saint-Léger for rest and reorganisation. On 15 May the brigade ammunition columns were aboilished and merged into the Divisional Ammunition Column (DAC). Then on 18 May the brigade was numbered as CCXLIII (243rd) Brigade and at the same time all its batteries were posted to the other brigades of 48th (SM) DA:

- 1/4th Warwickshire Bty as D (H) Bty of CCXL (1/I SM) Bde
- 1/5th Warwickshire Bty as D (H) Bty of CCXLI (1/II SM) Bde
- D (H) Bty to CCXLII (1/III SM) Bde

In exchange, CCXLIII Brigade HQ was assigned three recently formed batteries from the other brigades, effectively forming a new unit equipped with 18-pounder guns:

- A Bty, ex D/CCXL Bty
- B Bty, ex D/CCXLI Bty
- C Bty, ex D/CCXLII Bty

==== Somme ====
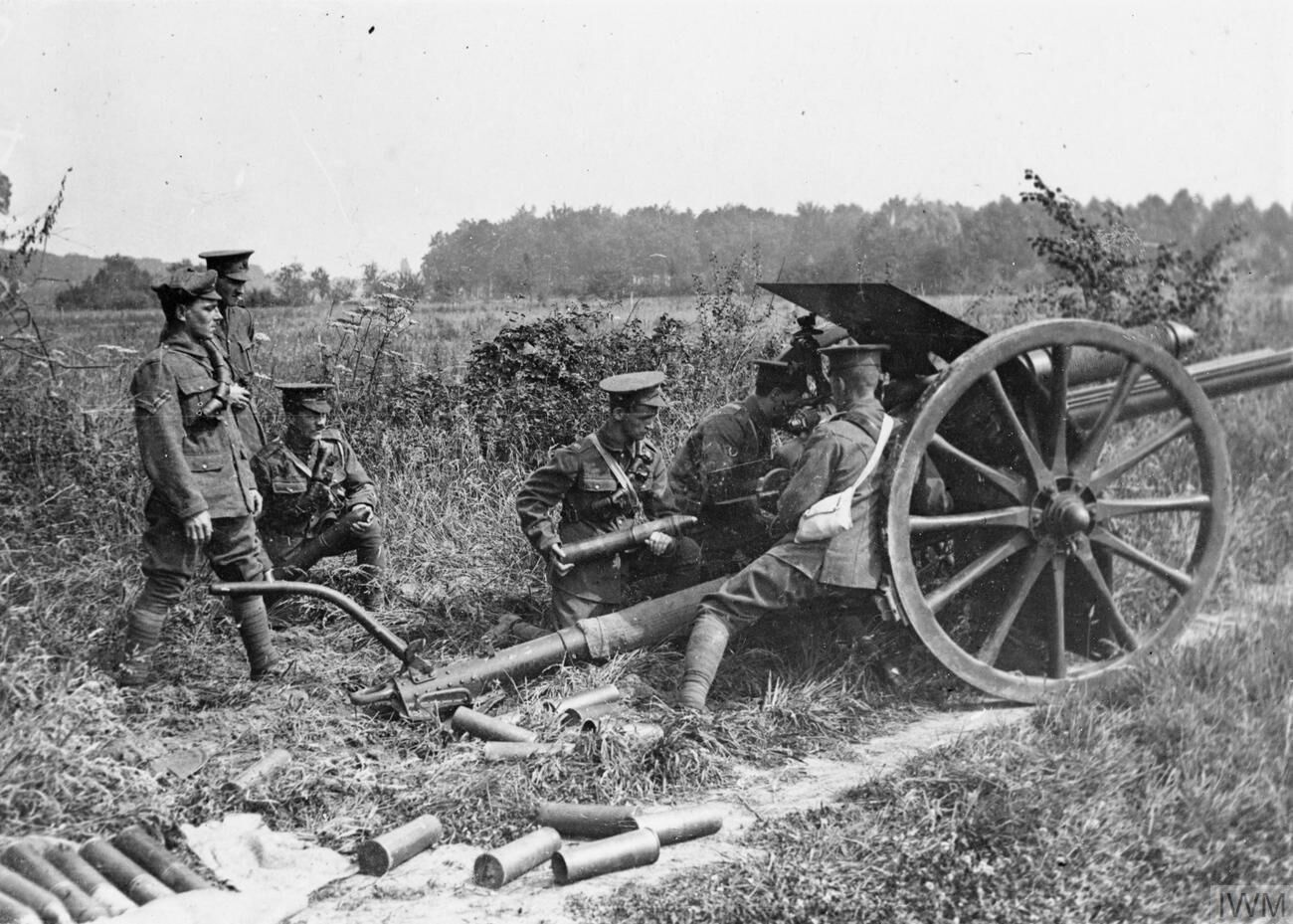
18-pounder in action on the Somme

After a long period of trench warfare, 48th (SM) Division's first offensive operation was in the Battle of the Somme. Preparations became intense. The artillery brigades alternated in frontline positions at Sailly and the DAC began dumping additional ammunition close to the guns. The bombardment began on 24 June and B Bty took part, attached to 29th Division's artillery. The rest of the brigade gathered at the wagon lines behind Mailly-Maillet on 28 June ready for the attack planned for next day, but Z Day was delayed by two days while the bombardment continued and the brigade stood fast. The battle was launched on 1 July 1916. Most of 48th (SM) Division was in reserve, only two battalions being engaged, but CCXLIII Bde moved up to positions between Mailly-Maillet and Auchonvillers to support 29th Division. However, the infantry assault on this front having failed disastrously, 29th DA ordered it back. That evening it was sent to assist 31st Division, whose attack had also failed.

Orders for 48th (SM) Division to resume the attacks next day were cancelled. Firing continued along the line 'without any very definite results', and CCXLIII Bde was pulled out on 4 July. It then relieved 31st DA at Colincamps on 6 July and began firing day and night into Serre. With an ammunition allowance of 120 rounds per gun per day its orders were to harass the enemy and keep the barbed wire cut. 48th (SM) Division carried out various feint attacks, on 7 July and again on 14 July before the Battle of Bazentin Ridge. CCXLIII Brigade moved its HQ to Courcelles-au-Bois on 10 July, and it kept up small bombardments on enemy communication trenches and gaps in the wire. It was relieved and went back to the wagon lines at Saint-Léger on 20 July. Next day the brigade went to Aveluy, where it took over from 12th (Eastern) Division's artillery. Lieutenant-Col West was in command of Left Group consisting of C, D (H) and half B Btys from CCXL Bde as well as the two of his own CCXLIII (B Bty having been temporarily split between A and C to bring them up to six guns each). The group began a preparatory bombardment at 20.30 on 22 July for the following morning's attack by 1st Australian Division (the Battle of Pozières). 48th (SM) Division advanced some way on the flank, and then 143rd (Warwickshire) Bde consolidated the Pozières position on 24 July. On 28 July 48th (SM) DA was relieved by 12th (E) DA, and went back to the wagon lines behind Bouzincourt. On 30–31 July CCXLIII Bde marched via Amplier to Saint-Ouen.

After two weeks' rest, the brigade retraced its steps and returned to the wagon lines at Bouzincourt on 12 August. Next day the gunners relieved those of 12th (E) DA, taking over their guns in position, with the three batteries of CCXLIII Bde in 'Mash Valley', south of Ovillers-la-Boisselle. Lieutenant-Col West commanded the same Left Group as before. On 14 August a German counter-attack retook 'Skyline Trench', which 12th (E) Division had recently captured; 145th (South Midland) Bde took it back on 15 August, but an attack by the Australians on Mouquet Farm ('Mucky Farm') failed despite the assistance of 48th (SM) DA. On 18 August 48th (SM) DA isolated the German trenches with well-placed barrages and 143rd Bde crept right up to the barrage before taking the objectives by surprise. Once again, B Bty was broken up to bring the other two up to six guns. As the new line was consolidated on 22 August, Left Group loaned C/CCXL Bty to 25th Division to replace equipment casualties as it assaulted the Leipzig Salient. A follow-up attack by 7th Bde of 25th Division on 24 August, covered by 48th (SM) DA, succeeded in capturing 'Hindenburg Trench' across the rear of the Leipzig Salient. The group was relieved on 28 August and CCXLIII Bde HQ went back to the wagon lines at Bouzincourt for rest though the two six gun batteries immediately went into action again at Mesnil with 49th (West Riding) Division's artillery engaging trenches between Thiepval and the River Ancre. The gunners finally went back to the wagon lines on 7 September.

On 13 September 48th (SM) DA was brought forward to Mesnil to support 11th (Northern) Division's successful attack on the 'Wonder Work' at 18.30 on 14 September. CCXLIII Brigade returned to its wagon lines early the following morning ready to move at 2 hours' notice. The orders arrived at 14.00 and by 15.00 the brigade was marching via Albert to a position east of Ovillers to support next day's attack by the Canadians' on Courcelette and the 'Zollern Graben'; this was successful. On 17 September the Canadians completed the capture of the Zollern Graben and also took Mucky Farm. All the batteries fired in support of the attack on Thiepval on 26 September. Over the following days the Germans counter-attacked strongly, attempting to recapture 'Stuff Redoubt' and the 'Schwaben Redoubt', and when the batteries were relieved by 25th DA the situation was almost unchanged.

Lieutenant-Col West was killed by shellfire on 28 September while his guns were supporting the attack on the Schwaben Redoubt. He was buried in Aveluy Communal Cemetery Extension. He had been twice mentioned in despatches. After the war a brass plate in his memory was placed in St Mark's Church, Bilton, Warwickshire.

Lieutenant-Col J.R. Colville of CCXL Bde temporarily took over command and 48th (SM) DA was temporarily split into two 18-pdr and one 4.5-inch group to cover the line at Gommecourt Park. CCXLIII Brigade again formed two six-gun batteries by splitting C Bty between the other two. Shortly afterwards, on 13 October, 48th (SM) DA was ordered to reorganise into permanent six-gun batteries. This was carried out on 18 October 1916, with CCXLIII Bde being broken up to bring the rest of the 18-pdr batteries up to a strength of six guns each: A and half of B Bty went to CCXL Bde, the other half of B Bty and C Bty to CCXLI Bde. Those two brigades (including 1/4th and 1/5th Warwickshire (H) Btys) continued to serve with 48th (SM) Division for the rest of the war, at Ypres and in Italy

=== 2/IV South Midland Brigade ===
The 2nd Line brigade was formed on 21 October 1914 at 25 per cent establishment by men drawn from the 1st Line. It then began recruiting from 4 January 1915, when it was assigned to the 2nd South Midland Division (later 61st (2nd South Midland) Division) at Northampton, where the brigade concentrated on 5 February. While stationed at Northampton, the division formed part of First Army of Central Force, but once the 48th Division had gone to France, the 61st replaced it around Chelmsford as part of Third Army, Central Force, responsible for coastal defence. 2/IV South Midland Bde took over the billets at Great Baddow from its 1st Line on 5 April. By the end of August all remaining Home Service men had been transferred to provisional (home defence) units and the whole brigade was available for overseas service. At this time it was commanded by Lt-Col W.S. Tunbridge. In September 1915 it exchanged billets with 2/II SM Bde at Writtle. 2/5th Warwickshire Bty was disbanded and its men distributed on 3 September, but was reformed on 9 December. On 6–7 January 1916 the brigade was brought up to strength by the arrival of recruits from 3rd Line training centre of the South Midland RFA at White City, Bristol, and from No 7 TF Artillery Training Centre at Winchester. On 20 January the brigade received two old 5-inch howitzers and on 24 January four obsolete French De Bange 90 mm guns for training (though it was training to use the modern 4.5-inch howitzer). At this time the brigade was temporarily commanded by Maj Attwood Torrens.

In February the division moved to Salisbury Plain for final battle training. Only when it prepared to go overseas were modern guns issued. In May it concentrated in the Tidworth–Bulford area, and on 16/17 May 1916 2/IV (SM) brigade was redesignated CCCVIII Brigade RFA (308 Bde) and reorganised: 2/4th Warwickshire (H) Bty went to CCCVI (2/II SM) Bde as D (H) Bty; similarly 2/5th Warwickshire (H) Bty to CCCVII (2/III SM) Bde as D (H) Bty. CCCVIII Brigade was then reformed with three 18-pdr batteries (A, B and C) and one 4.5-inch howitzer battery (D (H)).

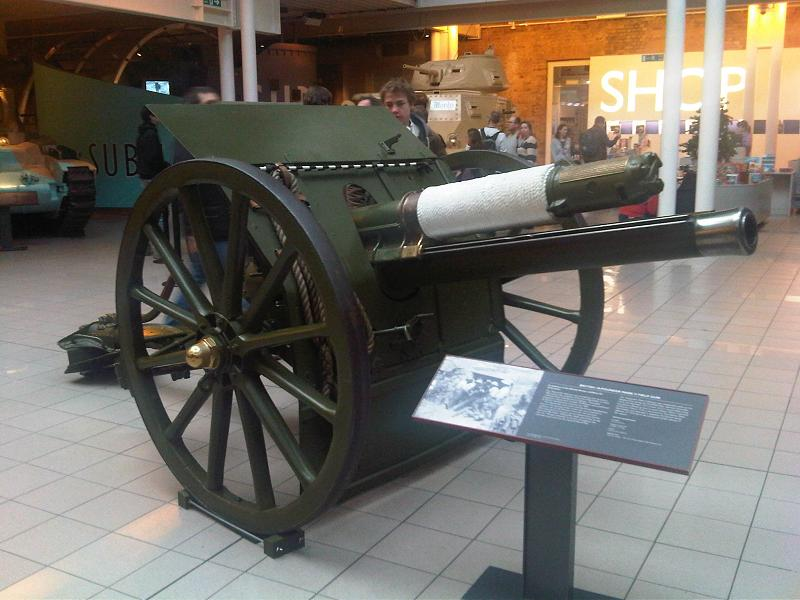
18-pounder preserved at the Imperial War Museum.

CCCVIII Brigade entrained at Amesbury on 21 May for Southampton Docks, where it boarded the SS S.W. Miller, landing at Le Havre on 22 May. It then went by train to Merville, where 61st (2nd SM) Division completed its concentration on 28 May. The brigade was commanded by Maj (soon to be Lt-Col) Edmund Furse. Parties from the brigade went to Annequin to be attached to 33rd Divisional Artillery for introduction to front line duties. On 13 June CCCVIII Bde moved into the line at Laventie and together with A, B and D (H) Btys of CCCVII Bde and C Bty of CLVIII Bde, all under Lt-Col Furse, it relieved Left Group of 38th (Welsh) Divisional Artillery. With inadequate telephone exchanges it proved difficult to control this mass of guns, and some of the batteries were released to other groups. CCCVIII Brigade's batteries participated in registration, SOS and retaliation fire, and covering raids.

==== Fromelles ====
That summer's 'Big Push' (the Battle of the Somme) began on 1 July, and further north 61st (2nd SM) DA joined in, with CCCVIII Bde engaged in systematic firing day and night, as well as wire cutting and supporting trench raids. B and C Btys received a good deal of enemy shelling directed by aircraft on 9–10 July. The division's first action was the Attack at Fromelles on 19 July 1916, a diversionary operation in support of the Somme Offensive. Prior to the attack 61st (2nd SM) DA was reorganised with CCCVIII Bde HQ in Laventie now in charge of Centre Group with B/CCCV, C/CCCV, A/CCCVI, and D/CCCVI Btys of 61st (2nd SM) DA, with D, O, and Z Btys Royal Horse Artillery under command. Artillery preparation began on 18 July after which the enemy wire was in bad shape, but the bombardment failed to suppress the enemy artillery or machine guns. The infantry attack was a disaster, the assaulting battalions taking very heavy casualties. 61st (2nd SM) Division was so badly mauled that it was not used offensively again in 1916, and the sector settled down to routine trench warfare. Considerable effort was expended on Counter-battery fire against hostile minenwerfers.

==== Reorganisation ====
On 16 September 1916 CCCVIII Bde was reorganised: C Bty was broken up, with Right Section joining A Bty and Left Section B Bty, making each up to six guns. On 20 October 520 (H) Battery, recently arrived from England, joined the brigade to become C (H) Bty. On 26 September Lt-Col F. Hilder, who had been commanding a Group of 61st (2nd SM) DA, assumed temporary command of CCCVIII Bde; he then handed over to Maj H.D. Day of A Bty on 26 October until Lt-Col S.O. Morter arrived to take permanent command on 30 October. From 18 November sections of 61st (2nd SM) DA were relieved by 6th Divisional Artillery and marched to Martinsart on the Somme, where CCCVIII Bde took over the guns of LX Bde in position, together with a large ammunition allocation. Here it resumed routine trench firing

On 26 January 1917 CCCVIII Bde was broken up and its batteries dispersed to other brigades in 61st (2nd SM) DA and to various Army Field Artillery brigades:

- A Bty: to CLV AFA Bde
- B Bty: to CCCXI AFA Bde as C Bty
- C (H) Bty:
  - R Sec to D (H)/CCCXV AFA Bde
  - L Sec to D (H)/LXXXVI AFA Bde
- D (H) Bty:
  - R Sec to D (H)/CCCVI Bty
  - L Sec to D (H)/CCCVII Bty

Major Attwood Torrens, who had commanded the brigade during training in England, was killed in action on 8 December 1916 and buried at Pozieres Military Cemetery. Lieutenant-Col Edmund Furse, who had commanded the brigade at Laventie, was also killed on 19 May 1918 and buried at Dormans French National Cemetery.

== Postwar ==
When the TF was reconstituted on 7 February 1920, the brigade was reformed as 4th Warwickshire (Howitzer) Battery of 3rd South Midland Brigade, which soon became 68th (South Midland) Field Brigade.

== Honorary Colonels ==
- H.H. Mulliner, (chairman of the Mulliners coachbuilding business and managing director of Coventry Ordnance Works) was appointed Honorary Colonel of IV South Midland Brigade on 1 May 1908
- Lt-Gen Sir Edward Bethune accepted the Hon Colonelcy of CCCVIII Brigade on 9 January 1917, just before it was broken up.
