= 1st Warwickshire Volunteer Artillery =

1st Warwickshire Volunteer Artillery III South Midland Brigade, RFA 68th (South Midland) Field Regiment, RA Warwickshire Regiment, RA
- Royal Artillery cap badge
- Active: 30 May 1900–1 April 1971
- Country: United Kingdom
- Branch: Territorial Army
- Role: Field artillery
- Size: 2–4 Batteries
- Part of: 48th (South Midland) Division
- Garrison/HQ: Birmingham
- Nicknames: 'The Balsall Heath Artillery' 'The Stoney Lane Boys'
- Engagements: First world War: Battle of the Somme; Battle of Fromelles; Battle of Vimy Ridge; Battle of Messines; Third Battle of Ypres; German Spring Offensive; Hundred Days Offensive; Second World War: Battle of France; Italian campaign

The 1st Warwickshire Volunteer Artillery, or 'Balsall Heath Artillery', was a part-time unit of Britain's Royal Artillery recruited from Birmingham. It served on the Western Front during the First World War, including the Battles of the Somme, Vimy Ridge, Messines, Ypres, the German Spring Offensive and the final victorious Hundred Days Offensive. During the Second World War it fought in the Battle of France and was evacuated from Dunkirk. Later in served in the Italian campaign. It continued in the postwar Territorial Army, through a series of mergers, until 1971.

== Volunteer Force ==
The 1st Warwickshire Volunteer Artillery was formed at Balsall Heath in Birmingham on 30 May 1900 when Nos 3 and 4 Warwickshire Batteries of the 1st Worcestershire and Warwickshire Artillery Volunteers became an independent unit, increased to four batteries. The batteries were equipped and trained as 'position artillery', to cooperate with the Volunteer Infantry Brigades. The Volunteer Artillery were part of the Royal Garrison Artillery (RGA), and the 1st Warwickshire were in the Southern Division, Royal Artillery. However, the divisional structure was abolished on 1 January 1902, when the unit was redesignated 1st Warwickshire RGA (Volunteers). Position artillery was redesignated as 'heavy artillery' in 1903. The new unit built itself a drill hall at Stoney Lane, between Balsall Heath and Sparkhill in Birmingham, in 1903.

== Territorial Force ==
When the Volunteer Force was subsumed into the new Territorial Force (TF) under the Haldane Reforms of 1908, the 1st Warwickshire RGA (V) was transferred to the Royal Field Artillery (RFA) as the III (or 3rd) South Midland Brigade (Note: In Royal Artillery terminology, a 'brigade' was a group of independent batteries grouped together for administrative rather than tactical purposes, the officer in command normally being a lieutenant-colonel rather than a brigadier-general or major-general, the ranks usually associated with command of an infantry or cavalry brigade.) at Birmingham and a separate IV (4th) South Midland (Howitzer) Brigade at Coventry. The Birmingham unit had the following organisation:

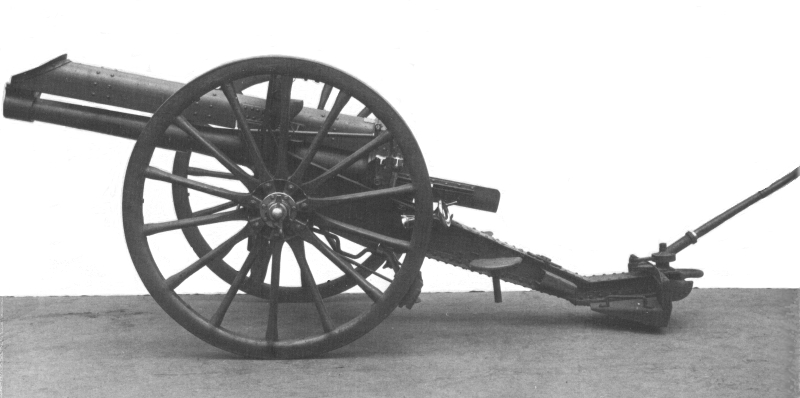
15-pounder gun issued to TF field batteries.

III South Midland Brigade

- Brigade HQ: Stoney Lane
- 1st Warwickshire Battery (from 4th Bty)
- 2nd Warwickshire Battery (from 2nd Bty)
- 3rd Warwickshire Battery (from 3rd Bty)
- 3rd South Midland Ammunition Column (from 1st Bty)

Both brigades were part of the TF's South Midland Division. Each battery of III SM Brigade was issued with four 15-pounder guns.

== First World War ==
=== Mobilisation ===
The units of the South Midland Division had just departed for their annual summer camp when emergency orders recalled them to their drill halls. All units were mobilised for full time war service on 5 August 1914 and moved to concentrate in the Chelmsford area as part of Central Force by mid-August 1914.

On 10 August, TF units were invited to volunteer for Overseas Service. On 15 August 1914, the War Office (WO) issued instructions to separate those men who had opted for Home Service only, and form these into reserve units. On 31 August, the formation of a reserve or 2nd Line unit was authorised for each 1st Line unit where 60 per cent or more of the men had volunteered for Overseas Service. The titles of these 2nd Line units would be the same as the original, but distinguished by a '2/' prefix and would absorb the flood of volunteers coming forwards. In this way duplicate batteries, brigades and divisions were created, mirroring those TF formations being sent overseas.

=== 1/III South Midland Brigade, RFA ===
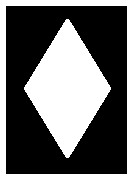
48th (South Midland) Divisional insignia during the First World War

The training of 1st South Midland Division proceeded satisfactorily, and it was selected for service on the Western Front. Orders arrived on 13 March 1915 and III South Midland Bde entrained on 30 and 31 March for Southampton aboard eight trains departing at two hour intervals. At Southampton it embarked on two transports, landing at Le Havre under the command of Lieutenant-Colonel Arthur Cossart (a Regular officer) on 1 April. By 3 April the division had concentrated near Cassel, and on 10 April III South Midland Bde's batteries were attached to the Regular RFA brigades of 6th Division in the Armentières sector for introduction to frontline procedures. The batteries were allocated a small number of shrapnel shells for registering the guns, but found that the old fuzes issued in December 1914 were useless. On 18/19 April the brigade took over its own section of front near Ploegsteert ('Plugstreet') with observation posts (OPs) near St Yves, and the batteries began registering targets in their respective zones. They came under fire for the first time, from German guns in the direction of Messines. The batteries and brigade ammunition column (BAC) then settled to improving their OPs, gun positions and the supply tracks leading to them. The weeks passed with the guns firing their small allowance of ammunition on routine targets or in retaliation for enemy fire.

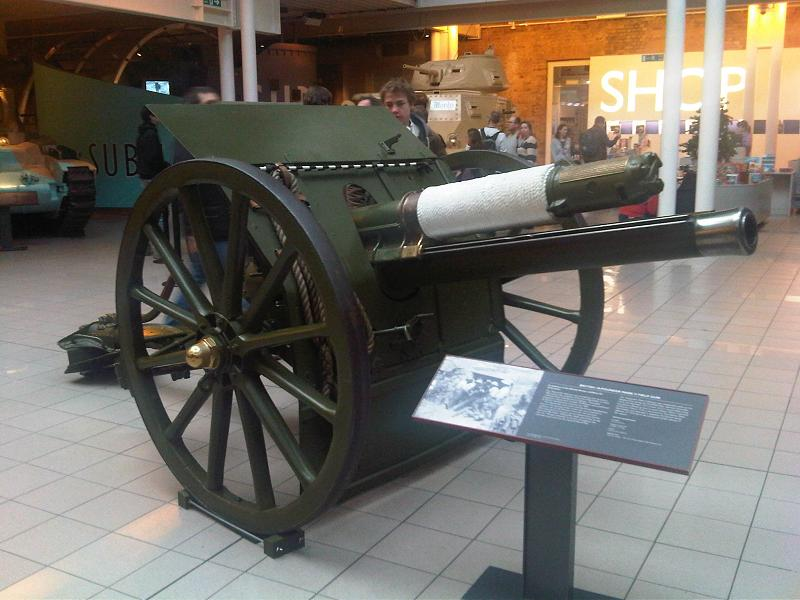
18-pounder gun preserved at the Imperial War Museum.

On 12 May the division was designated the 48th (South Midland) Division. On 6 June the brigade was relieved and went into billets in La Creche. After another short spell at Plugstreet (22–24 June) the brigade left on a four-day march to Auchel. Here a planned tour of duty in the line was cancelled, and on 21 July 1/III South Midland Bde was re-equipped with modern 18-pounder guns. It then took over French gun positions at Sailly-au-Bois near Hébuterne in the Somme sector, where 48th (SM) Division joined the newly formed Third Army.

Apart from occasional exchanges of fire with German batteries, the sector was quiet for the rest of the year as the brigade learned the routines of trench warfare, switching positions, improving gun pits, strengthening observation posts (OPs), registering targets around Gommecourt and harassing enemy working parties. On the night of 25/26 November the brigade supported a carefully-planned trench raid by 1/6th Battalion, Gloucestershire Regiment, on Gommecourt Park. The 18-pdrs fired in the afternoon to cut the barbed wire, then the waiting infantry attacked when clouds obscured the bright moonlight. The forward observation officer (FOO) with the infantry support party in No man's land called down a previously registered Box barrage onto the edge of the woods to isolate the sector to be attacked. The raid was a success. On 29/30 January the brigade supported another large raid on Gommecourt Park by 1/6th Gloucesters and 1/5th Battalion, Warwickshire Regiment. In the new year the brigade was regularly involved in prearranged bombardments of enemy trenches in conjunction with the Corps heavy artillery, and German artillery fire also increased. On 12 February a German observation aircraft ranged heavy guns onto 1/3rd Warwick Bty, causing a number of casualties and leading to the temporary abandonment of the gun positions.

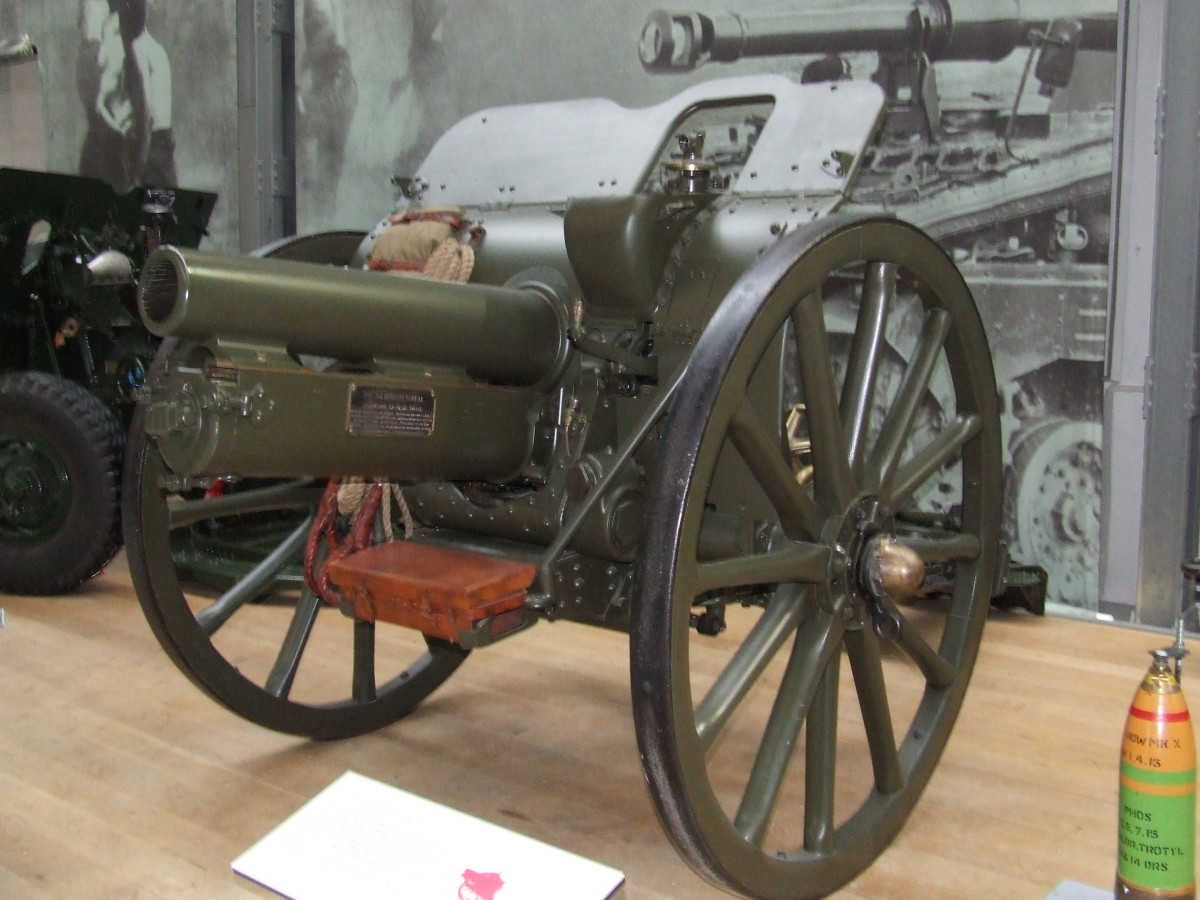
4.5-inch howitzer at the Royal Artillery Museum.

1/III South Midland Bde formed an additional battery, D Battery, and sent it to collect its 18-pdrs on 3 May 1916. Then on 18 May the brigade was redesignated CCXLII (or 242nd) Brigade (Note: The brigade continued to refer to itself as '242nd (South Midland) Brigade'.) and the old batteries became A, B and C. At the same time D Bty transferred to CCXLIII (IV South Midland) Bde in exchange for D (H) Bty (originally from CXXVI Bde in 37th Division, a Kitchener's Army formation), equipped with four 4.5-inch howitzers, which became D (H) Bty of CCXLII Bde. The BAC was also abolished and merged into the Divisional Ammunition Column (DAC) as its 3rd Section.

==== Somme ====
After a long period of low-level Trench warfare, 48th (SM) Division's first offensive operation was in the Battle of the Somme. In May 48th (SM) Division was relieved in its trenches in front of Gommecourt by 56th (1st London) Division, which was to make a diversionary attack there, while 48th transferred to Fourth Army where it was to be in reserve to VIII Cops for the main attack. After it was relieved CCXLII (SM) Bde moved to Saint-Léger for rest and training. On 13 June Brigade BQ returned to Sailly, and the batteries moved into positions; 6th Bty of the French 37th Field Artillery Regiment was attached to the brigade with 75mm field guns for firing gas shells on counter-battery (CB) tasks and over enemy communications. The bombardment began on 24 June and was planned to extend over five days designated, U, V, W, X and Y, with the assault coming on Z day. The 18-pdrs were employed in wire-cutting and 'searching' trenches and hollows with shrapnel shell, while the 4.5s attempted to destroy communication trenches and machine gun positions. CCXLII (SM) Brigade was assigned trenches between 'The Hook' and 'The Point' and back to La Louviere Farm. Each afternoon the guns ceased fire to allow observation aircraft to photograph the results. Bad weather hampered observation, and two extra days (Y1 and Y2) were added to the programme, for which ammunition had to be rationed. On the night of 28/29 June the 1/7th Bn Worcestershire Regiment carried out a raid covered by a shrapnel barrage from A, B and D Btys of CCXLII (SM) Bde, which lifted forward to form a box barrage with high explosive shell behind the German front line and shrapnel on the flanks.

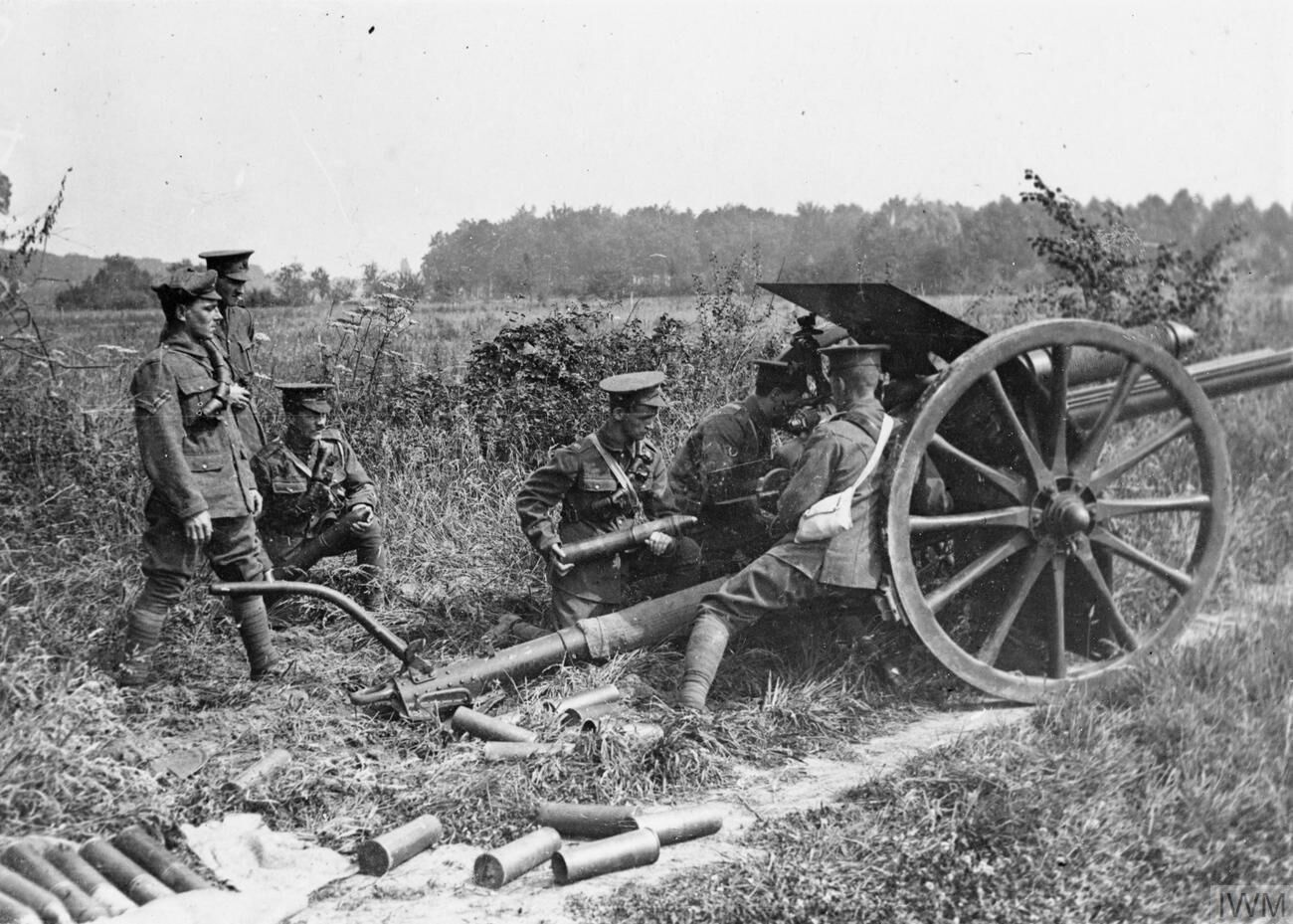
18-pounder in action on the Somme.

The battle was launched on 1 July 1916. Most of 48th (SM) Division held the sector between Gommecourt and Serre, which was not being attacked. CCXLII (SM) Brigade had little to do on the day, but suffered a number of casualties from German retaliatory fire. The attacks on either flank had been disasters, and orders for 48th (SM) Division to resume the attacks next day were cancelled. The brigade continued firing to cut the German wire, on enemy communications, and to support raids, but no serious attack was made on this sector. The infantry of the division had already been moved southwards and had taken part in the Capture of Ovillers. On 21 June CCXLII (SM) Bde moved to Aveluy and brigade HQ took command of Right Group of 48th (SM) Divisional Artillery (DA), including A and half B Btys of CCXL (I SM) and B Bty of CCXLI (II SM) Brigades, being shelled with gas as it moved into position. The Group supported 48th (SM) Division's attacks up 'Mash Valley' as part of the Battle of Pozières Ridge (21–23 June). Afterwards the batteries moved up to positions in Mash Valley, east of La Boisselle. The brigade suffered a number of casualties before it was relieved on 28 June and went to Saint-Ouen for rest.

The brigade returned to the line at Bouzincourt on 12 August and next morning the batteries took over the guns of the batteries they were relieving, in action east of La Boiselle, with brigade HQ in the Usna Redoubt, looking up Mash Valley. The division was now under II Corps. Barrage firing was almost continuous on 14–16 August as 48th (SM) Division's infantry worked their way from 'Ration Trench' up towards 'Skyline Trench' but were unable to hold it. The guns fired defensive and 'SOS' barrages against German counter-attacks. 48th (SM) Division renewed its attacks on 18 and 21 August, finally capturing most of Leipzig Redoubt by moving closely behind an 'excellent barrage'. The division attacked again on the evening of 27 August; this time some of the infantry ran into their own creeping barrage, but the attack was a partial success. Next day the division was relieved amidst heavy rain and mud. Brigade HQ withdrew to Bouzincourt, but the batteries remained in action, supporting 49th (West Riding) Division's attacks on Mouquet Farm ('Mucky Farm') and Thiepval. On 3 September the infantry of 49th (WR) Division advanced behind an 'excellent field gun barrage', but the attack on Thiepval failed. Meanwhile, D (H) Bty had remained at Ovillers, shelling Thiepval with HE and gas shells, both SK (tear gas) and PS (Chloropicrin). The bombardment was intense during the attack on 3 September, and the Germans retaliated with tear gas on the battery positions.

On 6 September the personnel of all the batteries were withdrawn to the wagon lines, leaving the guns in position. After a week's rest the 18-pdr batteries of 48th (SM) DA under CCXLII Bde HQ moved to fresh positions to support an attack by 11th (Northern) Division against the 'Wonder Work'. This was successfully carried out on the evening of 14 September behind another 'excellent barrage'. Afterwards the attached batteries went back to support the Canadian Corps, but A, B and C/CCXLII remained in position with II Corps on call for CB fire.

On 19 September the batteries moved into new positions at Pozières to prepare for the next attack on Thiepval Ridge. Thick mud made moving and preparing gun positions difficult, and enemy shellfire continually cut the telephone lines; the attack was delayed because of the conditions. D (H) Battery now returned to the brigade, and B/CCXlII and D (H)/CCXLI were also attached. A wireless station was established at brigade HQ and worked with aircraft from No 4 Squadron, Royal Flying Corps to register the guns on targets that were invisible to the ground OPs. The brigade was also able to respond to 'area calls' from the aircraft. The Battle of Thiepval Ridge began on 26 September: the infantry succeeded in clearing most of Mucky Farm and Thiepval village but were late starting towards the further objectives on the ridge and lost the barrage. Nevertheless, most of the third objective was captured. 'Regina Trench' and 'Stuff Redoubt' remained in German hands and the brigade continued to shell these over the following days. On the night of 28/29 September it supported an attack by 11th (N) and 18th (Eastern) Divisions to capture the 'Schwaben Redoubt'.

On 1 October the brigade withdrew, leaving their guns in position to be taken over by their relieving batteries, and collected others from the gun lines of the 18th (E) Division; these guns proved to be very worn. The brigade then moved through heavy rain to new positions at Sailly, arriving on 5 October, joining with CCXLIII Bde to form Left Group of 48th (SM) DA. The positions were ready by evening on 8 October. The brigade spent a quiet few weeks at Foncquevillers, wire-cutting and firing on the approaches to Gommecourt. On 19 October 48th (SM) DA was reorganised to bring the 18-pdr batteries up to six guns each. In CCXLII (SM) Bde this was done by splitting C Bty. On 28 October 531 (H) Bty joined the brigade. This battery had been formed on 30 June in theTF's 3rd Reserve Brigade at Cowshott Camp, near Aldershot, and was assigned to the Hampshire TF Association for administration. It sailed to Le Havre aboard the SS N.W. Miller on 22/23 October. The arrival of this battery gave CCXLII (SM) Bde the following organisation:

- A Bty + Right Section C Bty – 6 × 18-pdrs
- B Bty + Left Section C Bty – 6 × 18-pdr
- C (H) Bty (ex 531 (H) Bty) – 4 × 4.5-inch
- D (H) Bty (ex D (H)/CXXVI Bty) – 4 × 4.5-inch

==== Winter 1916–17 ====
The divisional sector continued quiet, apart from a heavy German bombardment early on the morning of 22 October, when they attempted to raid the British lines at Hébuterne. Brigade HQ in Bienvillers was frequently shelled. On 13 November B Bty participated in a false barrage to support Fifth Army's attack on Beaumont-Hamel (the Battle of the Ancre), while D (H) Bty carried out CB tasks. Thereafter normal trench routine continued, with occasional exchanges of fire with German artillery. The brigade was relieved at the end of November and moved back to billets in Saint-Amand, with the gun positions at Martinpuich. CCXLII Brigade HQ commanded a subgroup of artillery including LXX Bde of 15th (Scottish) Division, keeping up fire on the enemy trenches and communications. The weather and ground conditions were bad – at one point the brigade had to lay a light rail track over the mud to get an unserviceable howitzer out and replace it with another.

=== CCXLII Army Field Brigade ===
In the New Year, CCXLII (SM) Bde was reorganised again: on 16 January 1917, C (H) Bty (formerly 531 (H) Bty) was split up to bring the howitzer batteries of the other two brigades in the division up to six guns each. At the same time D (H) Bty was joined by a section from C (H) Bty of CLXXXVIII Brigade (40th Division). On 20 January the vacant C Bty was filled by an 18-pdr battery from 50th (Northumbrian) Division: A Bty (originally 1/1st Durham Bty) from CCLII (III Northumbrian) Bde, which was being broken up. This brought CCXLII (SM) Bde up to the new standard establishment of three 18-pdr batteries and one of 4.5-inch howitzers:

- A Bty (1/1st Warwickshire + half 1/3rd Warwickshire) – 6 × 18-pdrs
- B Bty (1/2nd Warwickshire + half 1/3rd Warwickshire) – 6 × 18-pdrs
- C Bty (1/1st Durham + half 1/2nd Durham) – 6 × 18-pdrs
- D (H) Bty (D (H)/CXXVI Bty + half C (H)/CLXXXVIII Bty) – 6 × 4.5-inch

On the same day (20 January 1917) the brigade left 48th (SM) Division and became an Army Field Artillery (AFA) brigade. AFA brigades were a new concept developed to provide an artillery reserve, allowing commanders to move field guns to reinforce a sector without breaking up the divisional structure. In practice, CCXLII AFA Bde remained under 48th (SM) DA until 18 March, when it went for rest. It then joined Canadian Corps on 30 March and was assigned to 4th Canadian Division, preparing for the Battle of Vimy Ridge.

==== Vimy Ridge ====
First Army had assembled a greater concentration of artillery than ever before, with one field gun for every 10 yards (9.1 m) of front, many brought forward to within 500 yards (460 m) of the front trenches. The additional field guns were cautiously registered under cover of the preparatory bombardment, which had begun on 20 March, and they remained undetected. Ample ammunition was dumped at the battery positions. Together with the heavy guns, the surprise bombardment of Vimy Ridge opened at 05.30 on 9 April was the most concentrated and powerful of the war. The field guns fired a creeping barrage advancing at 100 yards (91 m) in three minutes at a rate of three rounds per gun per minute, from one gun every 25 yards (23 m) of front, and also laid a standing barrage only 150 yards (140 m) beyond onto the first 'Black Line' objective, while the howitzers fired concentrations at specific targets. The infantry advanced behind the barrage in the dark, with snow and sleet at their backs blowing into the eyes of the defenders. 4th Canadian Division's objective was Hill 145, the highest point of the ridge; this was the only part of Canadian Corps attack that was held up, but the hill was secured on the afternoon of 10 April. The division's follow-up attack on 12 April also captured 'the Pimple' with the aid of another devastating barrage (including CCXLII AFA Bde). This was slowed to 100 yards (91 m) in four minutes, but even then the infantry were held up by the mud. Nevertheless, the scattered defenders were overcome in close fighting amid another snowstorm. CCXLII AFA Brigade was then attached to 3rd Canadian Division from 15 April to 18 May as the Canadians participated in the continuing Arras offensive.

==== Messines ====
After a short rest the brigade moved north to join II ANZAC Corps with Second Army on 24 May. It was attached to the New Zealand Division for the Battle of Messines. There was a long preliminary bombardment, and this time the surprise at zero hour on 7 June was the explosion of 19 huge mines. As at Vimy Ridge, the field guns fired creeping and standing barrages ahead of the advancing infantry. As each successive objective the creeping barrage became a protective barrage while the infantry reorganised for the next phase of the attack. Because of a bulge in the line, the New Zealanders initially had an open flank, which was protected by an enfilade barrage and smokescreen. The division crossed the Steenbeck stream, took the front trench system and moved steadily up the rising ground towards Messines village. For the final assault on the village the barrage was slowed, with 11 minutes between each 100 yards (91 m) lift. At 13.45 a German counter-attack was launched from their Oosttaverne Line, but their barrage missed the New Zealanders, who had excellent targets to fire at, and the British protective barrage was increased to intense fire; the attack was stopped before it reached the New Zealanders' advanced posts. Two fresh Australian brigades were passed through and at 15.10 they advanced down to the Oosttaverne Line behind the barrage, now moving at 100 yards (91 m) every three minutes. They were held up by undamaged concrete pillboxes and field gun positions, but the defenders panicked when the Australians penetrated between these strongpoints and the barrage passed beyond them, cutting the Germans' retreat. Unfortunately, when the leading ANZAC troops were relieved on 8 June the reserve divisions thought they were German attackers, and brought down their own defensive barrage on them, causing many casualties.

CCXLII AFA Brigade transferred to 25th Division under II Anzac Corps 9–16 June, then went for a month's rest before returning to the line with 3rd Division on 16 July.

==== Ypres ====
Fifth Army launched the Third Ypres Offensive on 31 July. Second Army transferred several of its divisions to Fifth Army, and received others in their place, including 37th Division, to which CCXLII AFA Bde was attached from 8 August. On 14 August the brigade was itself sent to Fifth Army to reinforce II Corps for the Battle of Langemarck, being assigned to 18th (E) Division. II Corps' attack, on 16 August, went in behind an 18-pdr creeping barrage moving at 100 yards (91 m) every five minutes, with standing barrages of 18-pdrs and 4.5-inch howitzers on targets in and beyond the area to be captured. However, a planned bombardment of the enemy pillboxes by heavy artillery had not taken place, and that by the 4.5s was ineffective. Struggling through exceptional mud and held up by undestroyed machine gun positions, the British attackers lost their barrage and the advance was stopped with few gains. When the enemy counter-attacked the SOS flares put up by the FOOs with the infantry were obscured by the German smokescreen, while the Germans' own standing barrage isolated the most advanced troops, who were forced to pull back by the end of the day.

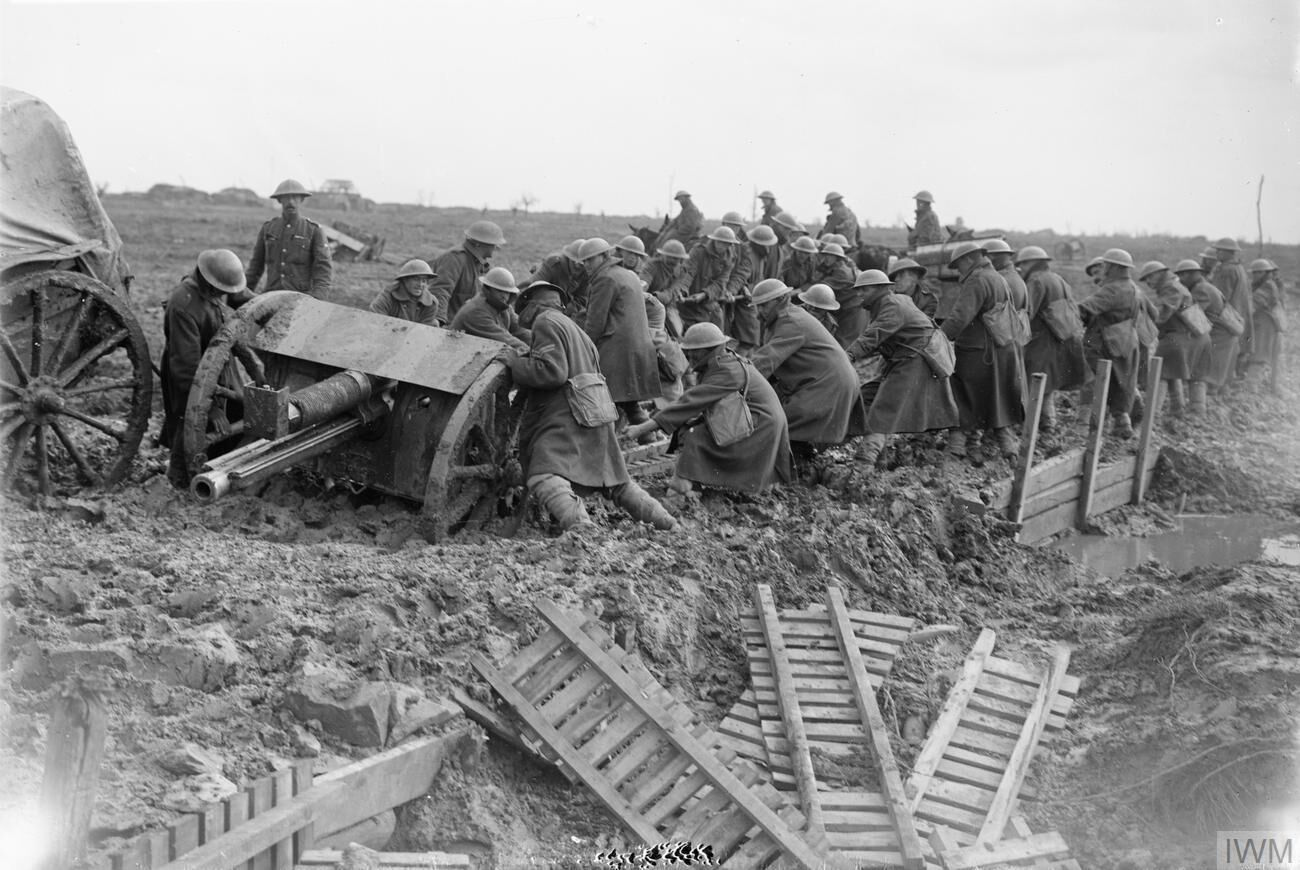
18-pounder being hauled out of mud at Langemarck, October 1917.

As the Langemarck fighting died down, CCXLII AFA Bde came under the command of 14th (Light) Division when it arrived from Second Army on 18 August. The division led II Corps' renewed attempt on 22 August to advance up the Menin Road and take Inverness Copse on the Gheluvelt Plateau. Although the copse was captured, it was lost again on 24 August when Germans attacked at 04.00. The defenders were hindered by their own supporting artillery shelling the wood: all telephone lines were cut and orders to lengthen the range and allow the infantry to hold a line halfway through the wood did not get through until 14.00, by which time it was too late.

After the failures thus far, Second Army took over the main direction of the Ypres offensive, with a pause for better preparation: the emphasis would be on the artillery. On 28 August CCXLII AFA Bde moved back to Second Army command under X Corps. It was attached to 23rd Division until 4 September, 24th Division 4–13 September, then back to 23rd Division on 13 September. This formation took part in the renewal of the offensive (the Battle of the Menin Road Ridge) on 20 September. This time there were five belts of fire in the covering barrages, a total depth of 1,000 yards (910 m), of which the field guns formed two, the one closest to the attackers moving rapidly in lifts of 50 yards (46 m) every two minutes. This barrage was described by eye-witnesses as 'magnificent both in accuracy and volume', and the infantry followed so closely behind it that many enemy outposts and counter-attack groups were overrun before they had time to climb out of their dugouts. The barrage then slowed down and the rate of fire decreased, as the infantry worked their way deep into the defence system. A two-hour halt was made in order to prepare for the second phase, but the standing barrage deterred the expected counter-attacks. At 0953 the barrage began moving again as the troops advanced to take the final objective: 23rd Division found these last few hundred yards the most difficult, with a number of concrete pillboxes to be subdued.

33rd Division relieved 23rd Division and took over CCXLII AFA Brigade on 25 September for the next forward bound (the Battle of Polygon Wood) starting next day. The artillery had moved up and applied much the same formula as for the Menin Road attack. However, 33rd Division was struck by a German spoiling attack during the relief, and its hastily reorganised attack came under heavy shellfire and failed. The barrages, however, completely disrupted German counter-attacks. CCXLII AFA Bde returned to 23rd Division, but moved to 5th Division on 2 October in time for the next attack (the Battle of Broodseinde). The artillery had been advanced another 1,000 yards (910 m) along specially-constructed plank roads, and ammunition had been dumped. The artillery plan was designed to mystify the Germans as to the time of the attack: full-scale practice barrages were fired several times from 27 September, but the final barrage only began at zero hour (06.00 on 4 October). 5th Division's attack was a partial success. The Battle of Poelcappelle was fought on 9 October: by now the rain and mud were so bad that many of the guns could not be hauled forward, and ammunition supply even with pack-horses was severely hampered. With inadequate artillery support the attack was disappointing.

Many artillery units by now were exhausted, and CCXLII AFA Bde was sent for rest on 24 October. On 3 November it joined XIX Corps, which had assume command of a sector of Fifth Army's line. CCXLII was one of four AFA brigades that took over a frontage from two exhausted divisional artilleries while the Second Battle of Passchendaele continued. On 7 November 35th Divisional Artillery assumed command of the artillery in this sector, including CCXLII AFA Bde. On 2 December the brigade was transferred to 1st Division until it was sent for rest on 15 December.

==== Early 1918 ====
On 27 December CCXLII AFA Bde joined IX Corps, first with 30th Division, then with 20th (Light) Division from 5 January 1918. XXII Corps (formerly II Anzac Corps) took over command of 20th (L) Division on 30 January. The brigade was with 37th Division under XXII Corps from 23 February to 20 March, when it left for rest. The German spring offensive was launched next day, but the brigade was continually posted to quiet sectors and was not involved in the major fighting. On 27 March it joined 46th (North Midland) Division with I Corps. The division held the quiet Vimy sector until 13 April when the Canadian Corps took over and the brigade came under 3rd Canadian Division. On 3 May the brigade was transferred to 4th Canadian Division under XVIII Corps, which was taking over the Vimy front. but the 4th joined the rest of the Canadian Corps three days later and was replaced by 52nd (Lowland) Division, recently returned from Palestine. On 2 July XVIII Corps HQ merged with VIII Corps, which took command of 52nd (L) Division. CCXLII Brigade was rested from 17 July to 14 August, when it returned to VIII Corps, now coming under 20th (L) Division.

==== Final advance ====
The Allies' counter-offensive (the Hundred Days Offensive) began with the Battle of Amiens on 8 August, and a series of coordinated attacks started on 26 September. 20th (L) Division made a successful diversionary attack against the Fresnoy sector on 27 September, but because it was holding a very wide frontage and the German Drocourt-Quéant Line lay ahead, it went no further. Then on 2 October patrols discovered that the enemy had retired during the night, and VIII Corps began following up. 20th (L) Division was withdrawn from the line on 6 October and sent for training, so on 12 October, CCXLII Bde moved to 58th (2/1st London) Division, which had been leading VIII Corps' advance.

Fifth Army and I Corps took over command of 58th (2/1st L) Division and CCXLII Bde on 14 October and the advance continued. For the next five weeks I Corps pressed steadily eastward in contact with the retiring enemy. 58th (2/1st L) Division forced a crossing of the Haute Deûle Canal on 16 October and advanced to the Douai–Lille railway behind a barrage. After a pause at the River Scarpe, which was held by German rearguards, the division crossed on 23 October and the steady pursuit continued. On 9 November CCXLII AFA Brigade became part of the Mobile Reserve. Hostilities on the Western Front ended two days later when the Armistice with Germany came into force.

=== 2/III South Midland Brigade, RFA ===
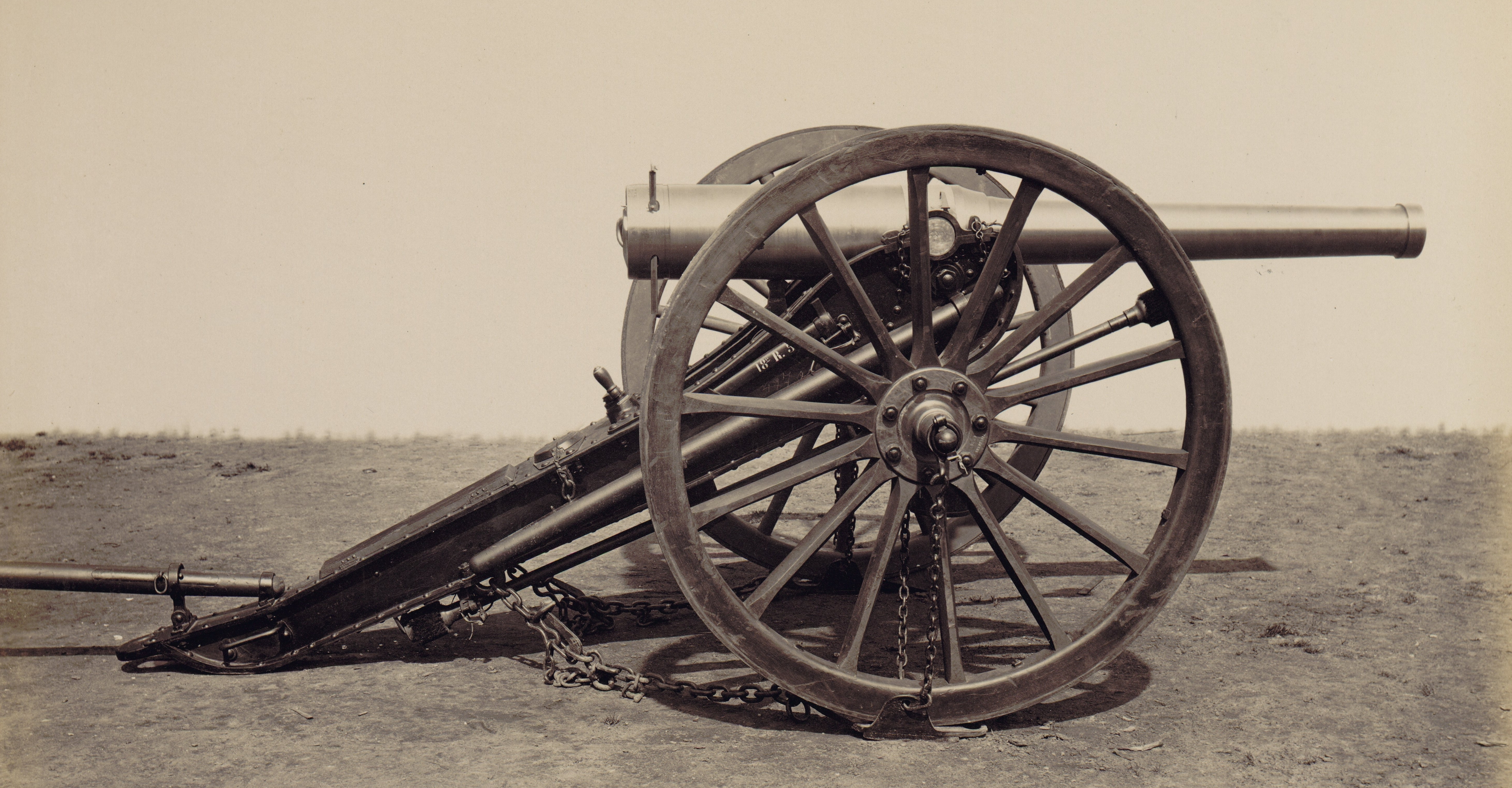
De Bange 90 mm French field gun issued to 2nd Line batteries.

The 2nd Line brigade was formed in the autumn of 1914, and in January 1915 it joined the 2nd South Midland Division (later 61st (2nd South Midland) Division) at Northampton. While stationed at Northampton, the division formed part of First Army of Central Force, but once the 48th Division had gone to France, the 61st replaced it around Chelmsford as part of Third Army, Central Force, responsible for coastal defence. 2/III South Midland Bde was stationed at Ingatestone, moving to Epping in September, Thorpe-le-Soken and Southminster in October and Great Baddow in December. On 17 September Lt-Col W.S. Tunbridge (formerly commander of 3rd Worcestershire Bty in II SM Bde) took command of the brigade, succeeded by Lt-Col F. Hilder (formerly of the Essex Royal Horse Artillery) on 30 October. Training continued, 2/III SM Bde usually carrying out tactical exercises with 183rd (2nd Gloucester and Worcester) Brigade. Equipment was scarce, and until the end of 1915 the only guns available for training were obsolete French De Bange 90 mm guns. Twelve modern 18-pdrs arrived in December for training, but in January 1916 the brigade was equipped with obsolescent 15-pounders handed over by 1st Line TF units. In February the division moved to Salisbury Plain for final battle training. Only when the division prepared to go overseas were 18-pounders issued. In May it concentrated in the Tidworth–Bulford area. Here on 16/17 May 1916 2/III (SM) brigade was redesignated CCCVII Brigade RFA (307 Bde) (Note: The brigade continued to refer to itself as '307 (South Midland) Brigade'.) and the batteries became A, B and C. It was joined by 2/5th Warwickshire (Howitzer) Bty from 2/IV South Midland Brigade (now CCCCVIII Bde), which became D (H) Bty, equipped with 4.5-inch howitzers.

==== Fromelles ====
61st (2nd South Midland) Divisional insignia during the First World War

The brigade entrained at Amesbury on 24 May for Southampton, where it embarked and arrived at Le Havre on 26 May, going into camp at Merville. Two days later 61st (2nd SM) Division completed its concentration. The artillery continued training, and sent parties up to 38th (Welsh) Division in the line for introduction to front line duties. From 11 June the batteries of CCCVII Bde moved into the line at Laventie, relieving Left Group of 38th (W) Divisional Artillery.

The bombardment for that summer's 'Big Push' (the Battle of the Somme) began on 24 June, and 61st (2nd SM) DA joined in, with CCCVII Bde engaged in wire-cutting and bombarding machine gun positions, as well as supporting trench raids at night. The division's first action was the Attack at Fromelles on 19 July 1916, a diversionary operation in support of the Somme Offensive. 61st (2nd SM) DA began relieving 39th DA on 6/7 July with CCCVII Bde in the Left Group at La Couture, supporting 183rd (2nd Gloucester and Worcester) Infantry Bde. Artillery preparation began on 18 July but six hours' fire on 19 July failed to suppress the enemy artillery by Zero hour (15.00). The infantry attack was a disaster, the assaulting battalions taking very heavy casualties. 61st (2nd SM) Division was so badly mauled that it was not used offensively again in 1916. It returned to the Laventie sector where the divisional artillery continued harassing and retaliatory fire and supporting trench raids.

On 16/17 September CCCV (2/I SM) Brigade was broken up among the other brigades of 61st (2nd SM) DA to bring their field batteries up to six guns each, giving CCCVII Bde the following organisation:

- A Bty (2/1st Warwickshire Bty + half 2/2nd Gloucestershire Bty) – 6 × 18-pdrs
- B Bty (2/2nd Warwickshire Bty + half 2/3rd Gloucestershire Bty) – 6 × 18-pdrs
- C Bty (2/3rd Warwickshire Bty + half 2/3rd Gloucestershire Bty) – 6 × 18-pdrs
- D (H) Bty (2/5th Warwickshire Bty) – 4 × 4.5-inch

After the reorganisation, Lt-Col H.A. Koebel (a Regular officer) came with several officers and men from the HQ of the disbanded CCCV Bde to take over command of CCCVII Bde. The brigade withdrew to the wagon lines, and then took over from Right Group of 31st DA in the Neuve-Chapelle sector.

==== 1916–17 ====
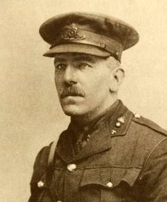
Maj Attwood Torrens, killed at Pozières on 8 December 1916.

61st (2nd SM) Division stayed in the line until it was relieved by 56th (1/1st London) Division on 28 October, but its artillery remained in position, carrying out a considerable amount of firing. On 18/19 November CCCVII Bde was relieved and marched to the Somme area, arriving at Pozières on 28 November. The brigade carried out intermittent shelling on enemy communication trenches, and received some enemy fire in exchange: Maj Attwood Torrens of D Bty was killed on 8 December while moving bis battery to a safer position. He was buried at Pozières British Cemetery at Ovillers-la-Boisselle.

Following a two-day bombardment, 61st (2nd SM) DA supported Fifth Army's operations on the Ancre from 11 to 17 January 1917. Afterwards the brigade withdrew to a rest and training area at Fontaine-sur-Maye. On 27 January D (H) Bty was made up to six howitzers when it was joined by Left Section of D (H)/CCCVIII Bty. Two days later Lt-Col Koebel was transferred to the corps heavy artillery, and was replaced in command of the brigade by Lt-Col A. Morton.

On 16–17 February the brigade returned to the line in the Somme sector, relieving French batteries near Framerville. The incoming British troops were greeted with increased German shellfire and raids, to which the brigade responded with large numbers of shells on SOS tasks and retaliatory fire, assisted by a section of 109th Siege Battery, RGA. Exchanges of fire continued until 17 March when the Germans pulled out of their trenches, beginning their withdrawal to the Hindenburg Line (Operation Alberich). The brigade followed up, covering the advance of 184th (2nd South Midland) Bde. On 5 April B Bty joined CLVI (2/II SM) Bde in supporting an operation by 183rd Bde against Hindenburg Line outposts at Fresnoy-le-Petit, while on 9 April the rest of the brigade supported 182nd (2nd Warwickshire) Bde against Fresnoy. As Fourth Army closed up to the new German line, CCCVIII Bde HQ moved up to Soyécourt on 12 April, when 61st DA came under 35th DA. On 15 and 25 April the brigade supported attacks against enemy trenches near Pontruet, while D (H) Bty shelled Bellenglise on the St. Quentin Canal.

==== Ypres ====
The brigade remained under the tactical control of 35th DA, supporting minor operations and raids, until 8 May, when the batteries were relieved in turn by 11 May and the brigade marched to Outrebois for rest. It returned to the line at Wancourt in the Arras sector on 9 June and resumed the usual programme of harassing fire and supporting trench raids until it was relieved at the end of the month. 61st (2nd SM) Division was then withdrawn and went into reserve for the Third Ypres Offensive. Like 48th (SM) Division it was not committed until the second phase of the offensive, the Battle of Langemarck, and then only late in the battle (22 August), when 184th Bde gained a few hundred yards of ground against camouflaged concrete pillboxes that were invisible to the artillery observers. On 27 August and 10 September the division was again halted by the strongpoints hidden in the farm buildings.

The division was then withdrawn to the Arras sector, where the brigade spent a quiet period at Athies, supporting regular raids on enemy lines. On 27 November Lt-Col A.F. Bayley arrived to take over command of the brigade, Maj Chance having been in acting command since the summer. At the beginning of December 61st (2nd SM) Division was sent as reinforcements to the Battle of Cambrai, but the divisional artillery was left in position at Athies and did not participate. It was relieved on 23 December and marched by stages to the area of Roye, where it was billeted in surrounding villages.

==== Spring Offensive ====
In early January 1918 CCCVII Bde moved back into the line, covering the spur by the River Omignon that 61st (SM) Division had taken over from the French. Here the policy was to remain quiet, not firing more than absolutely necessary, while working on the defences. Due to its manpower shortages the BEF had adopted a new policy of defence in depth, with an Outpost or Forward Zone, Battle Zone and Rear Zone. These were not continuous trench lines but consisted of a series of wired-in redoubts that could cover the intervening ground with machine gun fire. CCCVIII Bde's batteries in the Forward Zone had pre-prepared alternative and reinforcing positions, and an equivalent number of positions in the Battle Zone. Each 18-pdr battery had one gun deployed in the front line for anti-tank (A/T) duties.

The German spring offensive opened with a massive bombardment at 04.40 on 21 March, and all telephone lines to CCCVII Bde's batteries and OPs were cut by the shellfire. The German infantry advance 6 hours later was covered by fog, and the outposts, OPs and A/T guns were soon overrun. Where possible the batteries fired their pre-arranged counter-barrages blindly into the mist. CCCVII Bde's liaison officer with 1/5th Bn Gordon Highlanders in Fresnoy Redoubt continued reporting until noon, when the redoubt was surrounded; it finally surrendered at about 13.30. An infantry counter-attack from the Battle Zone failed. During the afternoon 65th Brigade, RGA, came under command of CCCVII Bde HQ, which used it to respond to an SOS call from the infantry in front. By the end of the day 61st (2nd SM) Division still held its Battle Zone on the reverse slope of the spur, but it was clear that most of CCCVII Bde's guns in the Forward Zone had been lost. Three guns of A Bty were successfully withdrawn during the afternoon, and two of B Bty fell back to cover the battle line west of Marteville before they too had to be withdrawn under heavy machine gun fire. The surviving gunners of B and C Btys retired having disabled their guns; the commander of C Bty, Maj T.J. Moss, was killed by a sniper as he withdrew his men. (Note: He is commemorated on the Pozières Memorial.) D Battery, in the most forward positions, had been overrun early in the day, firing to the last, and few of its men got away, Maj A.C.M. Riecke being posted missing. (Note: Later reported as a Prisoner of war.)) During the night three remaining guns of B Bty and five of C Bty were retrieved. While waiting to try to pull out their guns, the gun teams of B Bty were also able to withdraw two advanced 6-inch howitzers for 65th Bde, RGA. The brigade lost no casualties during this recovery operation, and also took two Germans prisoners.

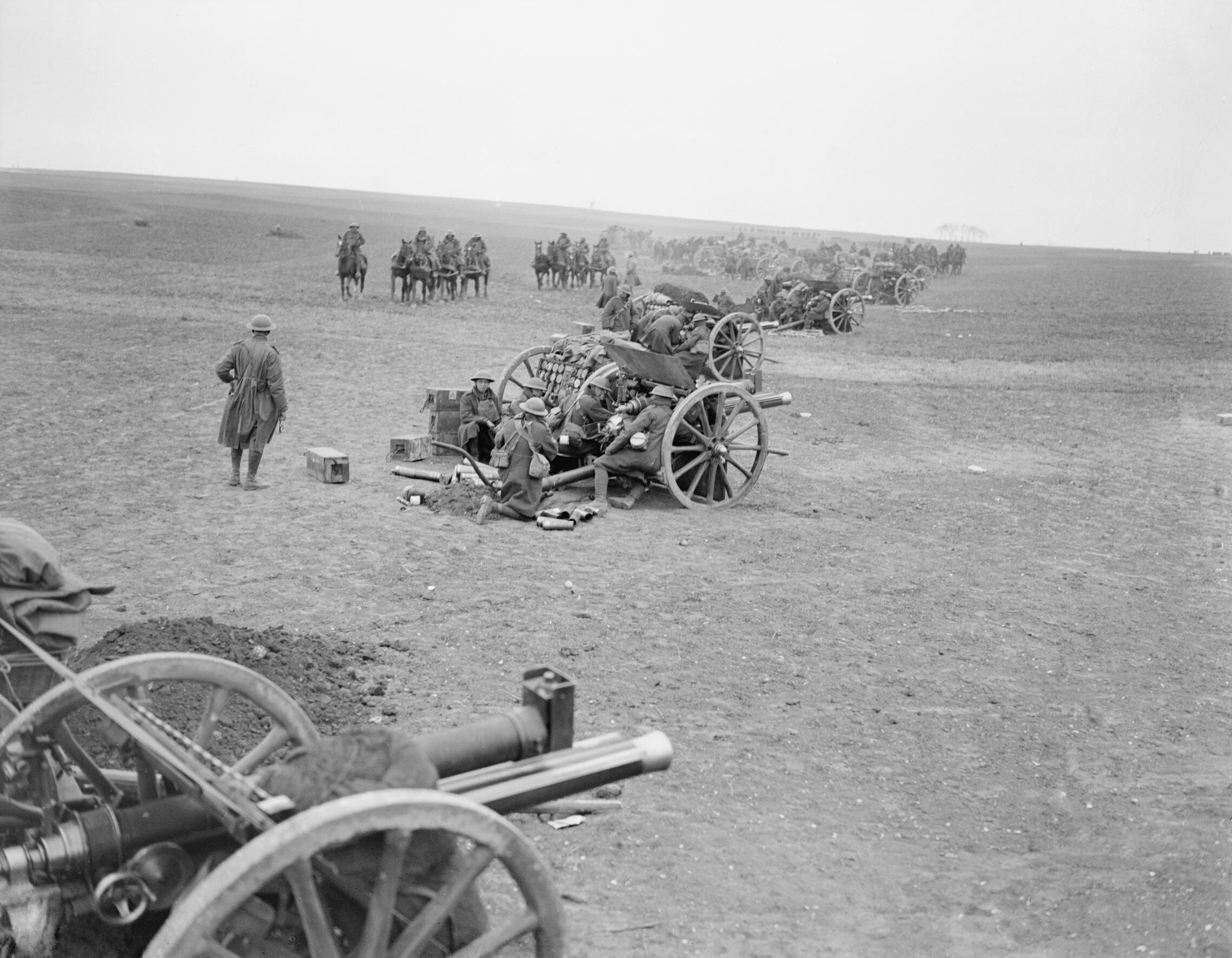
A battery of 18-pdrs in action in the open during the German Spring Offensive.

By 08.00 next morning, A & B Btys had a combined battery back in action covering the Battle Zone, while the remaining C Bty guns were sent back to the wagon lines to refit. That morning the Germans put in another heavy attack on the Holnon Plateau north of the Omignon. At 11.30 CCCVII Bde HQ came under heavy shellfire and became untenable, the staff hastily evacuating it and joining HQ of 65th Bde, RGA, at Villeveque before moving to Quivières. Meanwhile, the guns and wagons withdrew to Beauvois, losing one gun knocked out by shellfire. Although 61st (SM) Division was holding its own, flanking formations were in retreat, and the division had to retire, the guns supporting rearguards. Towards evening Beauvois became untenable and at 23.00 the remnants of CCCVII Bde was ordered to withdraw through Béthencourt to the west bank of the Somme. By 05.00 on 23 March the brigade was established at Mesnil-Saint-Nicaise. The division went into reserve early on 23 March, but CCCVII Bde remained in continuous action under 20th (Light) Division as a composite brigade ('Bayley's Group') with its own guns (A & B Bty) and those of CCCVI Bde to defend the bridgehead at Béthencourt.

During the morning of 24 March FOOs observed Germans deploying from buses to attack Béthencourt. These were out of range but the group had an attached section of 60-pounder guns from 111th Heavy Bty, RGA, and these engaged the buses, while the 18-pdrs supported a counter-attack by 183rd Bde at noon. However, the Germans crossed the Somme and a further retirement was ordered behind the Canal du Nord. CCVI Brigade moved out at 13.30 and CCCVII at 14.00 under machine gun fire, while the brigade medical officers used heavy artillery lorries to evacuate wounded from Mesnil. The guns crossed the canal near Dingon and retired to Herly, moving further back to Billancourt at 21.00. By now the British troops in this sector had come under French command. During 25 March Bayley's Group fired to cover the French withdrawal, and was almost cut off and captured at Gruny at the end of the day, before arriving at Villers-lès-Roye during the night. It continued to fall back during 26 and 27 March, between halting to cover the French, and was in position in front of Le Plessier by nightfall. The Germans made a heavy attack on the morning of 28 March (the Third Battle of Arras). With the enemy still coming on, Bayley's Group was withdrawn across the River Avre at Moreuil, the last batteries withdrawing under machine gun fire, by 16.30. Coming under 30th DA, the group shelled the enemy advancing through Le Plessier. By the end of the day the group was deployed west of Montdidier.

Allied counter-attacks began on 29 March, and at 07.00 Bayley's Group was moved to cover the front from Plessier to Fresnoy-en-Chaussée, coming into action by 12.30 and causing considerable loss to the enemy massing at Plessier. The French counter-attack failed, and the guns then covered their rapid retirement that evening. The batteries continued in action between Rouvrel and Morisel throughout 30 March–3 April. On 31 March CCCVI Bde HQ relieved Lt-Col Bayley and his exhausted CCCVII staff in charge of the 61st DA Group. Since the start of the German offensive CCCVII Bde had lost 1 officer and 6 other ranks (ORs) killed, 49 ORs wounded, and 7 officers and 56 ORs missing (mainly prisoners). In addition it had permanently lost 6 howitzers and 6 18-pdrs. The brigade now had A and B Btys in action, while the men and limbers of C Bty were acting as a BAC, and the survivors of D (H) Bty were attached to the DAC. The brigade also had D (H)/CCCVI Bty attached.

On 4 April the Germans put in a fresh attack (the Battle of the Avre), but their advance on Rouvrel was frustrated by the British barrage; CCCVII Bde around Guyencourt-sur-Noye contributed harassing fire by day and night. This marked the end of the German offensive on this front. The brigade was relieved next day and went to Croixrault where it was refitted with new guns and limbers. On 12 April A and B Btys went back into the line under 58th (2/1st L) Division covering Villers-Bretonneux. 61st (2nd SM) Division's exhausted infantry had been relieved and sent north (where they were engaged in the Battle of the Lys from 11 to 18 April), but the divisional artillery remained in position at Villers-Bretonneux, supporting British, Australian and French units.

CCCVII Brigade was relieved on 22–23 April and sent north to First Army. By the end of the month the batteries were reorganising and overhauling their guns at Liettres, some miles from Béthune. From 4 May the brigade began moving by sections into the line at Lillers, coming under 4th Divisional Artillery and settling into routine trench warfare. On 20/21 May CCCVII Bde exchanged with 255th Brigade, Royal Field Artillery of 51st (Highland) Divisional Artillery to cover 184th Bde of 61st (2nd SM) Division, which had returned to the line. The brigade supported the usual trench raids. To assist 5th Division's surprise attack on La Becque (Operation Borderland on 28 June) it carried out diversionary wirecutting on its own front and fired a smokescreen.

==== Hundred Days Offensive ====
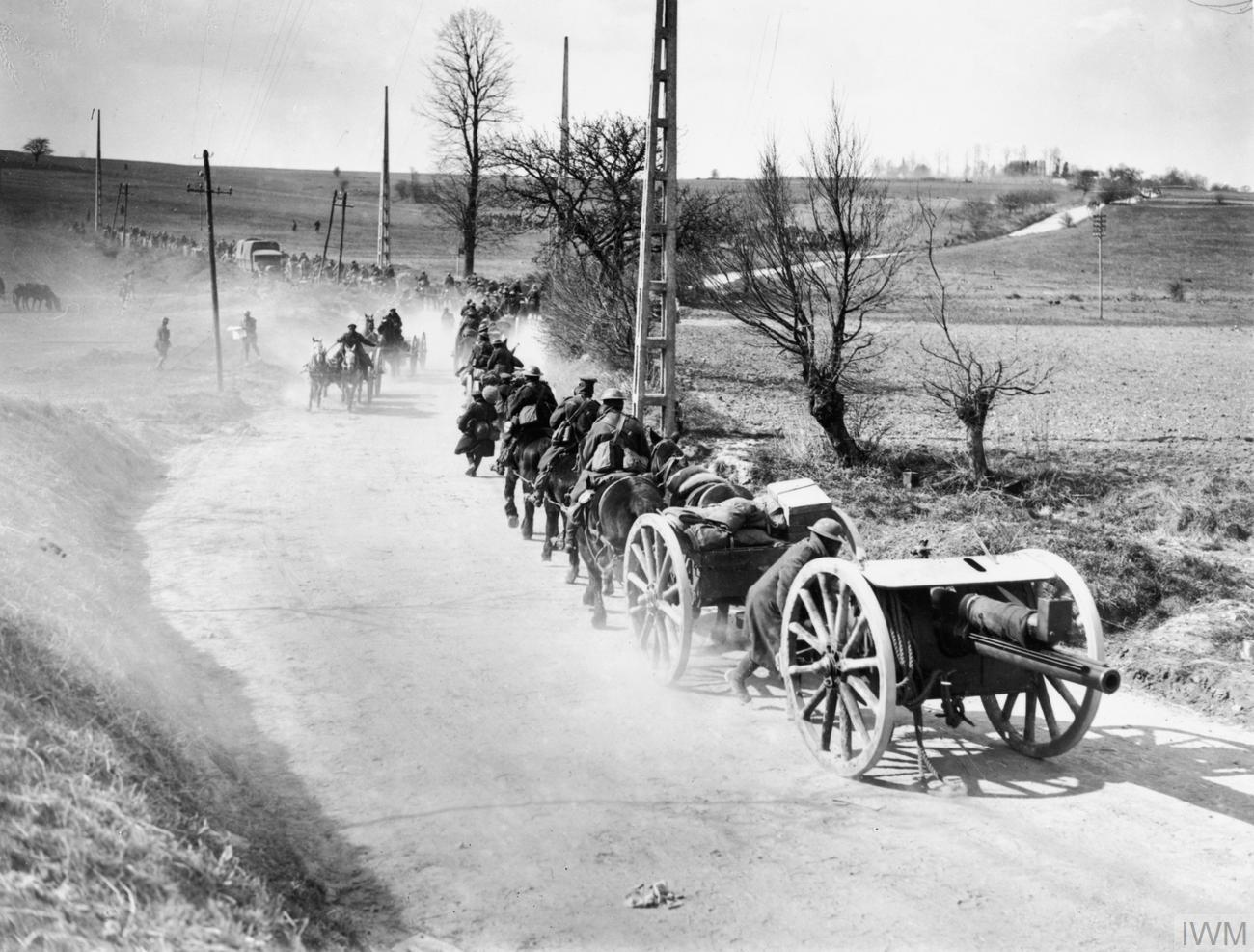
18-pounder battery moving up, 1918.

61st (2nd SM) Division was relieved in the first half of July and CCCVII Bde was pulled out of the line for training at Estrée-Blanche from 14 to 22 July. The division then moved north, where CCCVII Bde came under the 9th (Scottish) Division DA to renovate and construct new gun positions west of Meteren. It rejoined 61st (2nd SM) Division on 31 July and returned to training at Estrée-Blanche before going into the line west of Merville on 9 August with Fifth Army.

The Allied Hundred Days Offensive was now under way, and by 18 August Fifth Army's infantry was edging forward as the enemy gave up ground, with CCCVII Bde following up in support. On 31 August the enemy began withdrawing again; CCCVII Bde covered the British line and sent spare ammunition forward to CCCVI Bde as 'Advanced Guard Artillery' supporting 184th Bde. As the cautious advance continued CCCVII Bde took over the advanced guard role from 4 to 16 September, with B and D (H) Btys moving with the infantry to support local attacks. From 23 September the guns fired for 184th Bde's operation against the strongpoints of 'Bartlett Farm' and 'Junction Post', which was carried out from 30 September to 2 October.

61st (2nd SM) Division was transferred to Third Army and CCCVII Bde entrained for Doullens on 6/7 October. It reached Anneux on 11 October and became 'Support Brigade Group', affiliated to 182nd Bde. During Third Army's pursuit to the River Selle it supported an operation against Haussy by 24th Division on 16 October. Third Army now prepared a fullscale assault against the German positions (the Battle of the Selle) and on 19 October CCCVII Bde was ordered to hold a battery at immediate readiness to support the infantry advance. The creeping barrage for the battle commenced at 02.00 on 20 October under a full moon and one section of each of the brigade's 18-pdr batteries moved into the river valley in close support at 02.45. The rest of the brigade ceased fire at 03.30 and the infantry were on all their objectives by 08.30. The advanced sections continued moving forward over the following days while the brigade supported 19th (Western) Division's continued attack on Haussy on 22/23 October.

61st (2nd SM) Division now prepared to make its first setpiece attack in over a year. It was supported by nine RFA brigades, including its own and 19th (W) Division's. On 24 October the 18-pdrs laid down a creeping barrage, and on the right 183rd Bde reached its final objective in good time. 182nd Brigade alongside got held up by uncut wire, but 184th Bde passed through 183rd later in the day with a special barrage and completed the division's objectives for the day. CCCVII Brigade was ordered to move forward at 16.00. Next day the enemy retired and two battalions of 184th Bde advanced with close artillery support, CCCVII Bde being attached to 2/4th Oxfordshire and Buckinghamshire Light Infantry (OBLI). The division's attempts to establish bridgeheads across the River Rhonelle on 27 October were unsuccessful, but enemy counter-attacks suffered heavy casualties from the single guns that had been pushed well forward. The Rhonelle was crossed on 1–2 November (the Battle of Valenciennes), with 182nd Bde behind a creeping barrage making for the high ground and the village of Maresches. The attack was disrupted by an enemy counter-attack, and a repeat attack that evening with a fresh barrage was also held up; 184th Bde succeeded in gaining the bridgeheads next morning. The advance was now turning into a pursuit, and CCCVII Bde moved forward daily supporting 19th (W) and 24th Divisions and pulling off the road into fields for the night. There was little firing, but on 4 November a German bomber dropped two bombs into B Bty's wagon lines, killing two men and wounding 17. Hostilities were ended by the Armistice on 11 November.

After the Armistice CCCVII Bde marched back into France via Valenciennes, and in early December it went into winter quarters around Beauvoir-Wavans. Demobilisation began in January 1919 and on 11 June the brigade moved to Candas for final dispersal, which was completed on 23 June.

== Interwar ==
When the TF was reconstituted on 7 February 1920, 3rd South Midland Bde reformed at Birmingham with four batteries: the 1st and 2nd Warwicks at Birmingham, a new 3rd Warwicks formed from the former Warwickshire Royal Horse Artillery at Leamington Spa, and the 4th Warwicks (H) at Rugby from the former 4th South Midland Bde. In 1921 the TF was reorganised as the Territorial Army (TA) and the unit was redesignated as 68th (South Midland) Brigade, RFA, with the following organisation:

- Brigade HQ at Stoney Lane, Birmingham
- 269th (Warwick) Bty at Stoney Lane
- 270th (Warwick) Bty at Stoney Lane
- 271st (Warwick) Bty at Clarendon Place, Leamington Spa
- 272nd (Warwick) Bty (Howitzers) at 72 Victoria Avenue, Rugby

The brigade was once again part of 48th (SM) Division, which had also reformed in 1920. In 1924 the RFA was subsumed into the Royal Artillery (RA), and the word 'Field' was inserted into the titles of its brigades and batteries. The establishment of a TA divisional artillery brigade was four 6-gun batteries, three equipped with 18-pounders and one with 4.5-inch howitzers, all of First World War patterns. However, the batteries only held four guns in peacetime. The guns and their first-line ammunition wagons were still horsedrawn and the battery staffs were mounted. Partial mechanisation was carried out from 1927, but the guns retained iron-tyred wheels until pneumatic tyres began to be introduced just before the Second World War. In 1938 the RA modernised its nomenclature and a lieutenant-colonel's command was designated a 'regiment' rather than a 'brigade'; this applied to TA field brigades from 1 November 1938.

== Second World War ==
=== Mobilisation ===
The TA was doubled in size after the Munich Crisis, and most regiments formed duplicates: 68th (SM) Field Rgt formed 120th Field Rgt at Solihull on 12 July 1939. Part of the reorganisation was that field regiments changed from four six-gun batteries to an establishment of two batteries, each of three four-gun troops. For the Warwickshire artillery this resulted in the following organisation:

68th (South Midland) Field Regiment

- Regimental Headquarters (RHQ) at Birmingham
- 269 (Warwick) Field Bty at Birmingham
- 271 (Warwick) Field Bty at Clarendon Place, Leamington Spa

120th Field Regiment

- RHQ at Solihull
- 270 (Warwick) Field Bty at Birmingham
- 272 (Warwick) Field Bty at Rugby

The TA mobilised on 1 September 1939, just before the outbreak of war, with 68th (SM) Fd Rgt in 48th (SM) Division and 120th Fd Rgt in the newly formed 61st Infantry Division.

=== 68th (South Midland) Field Regiment ===
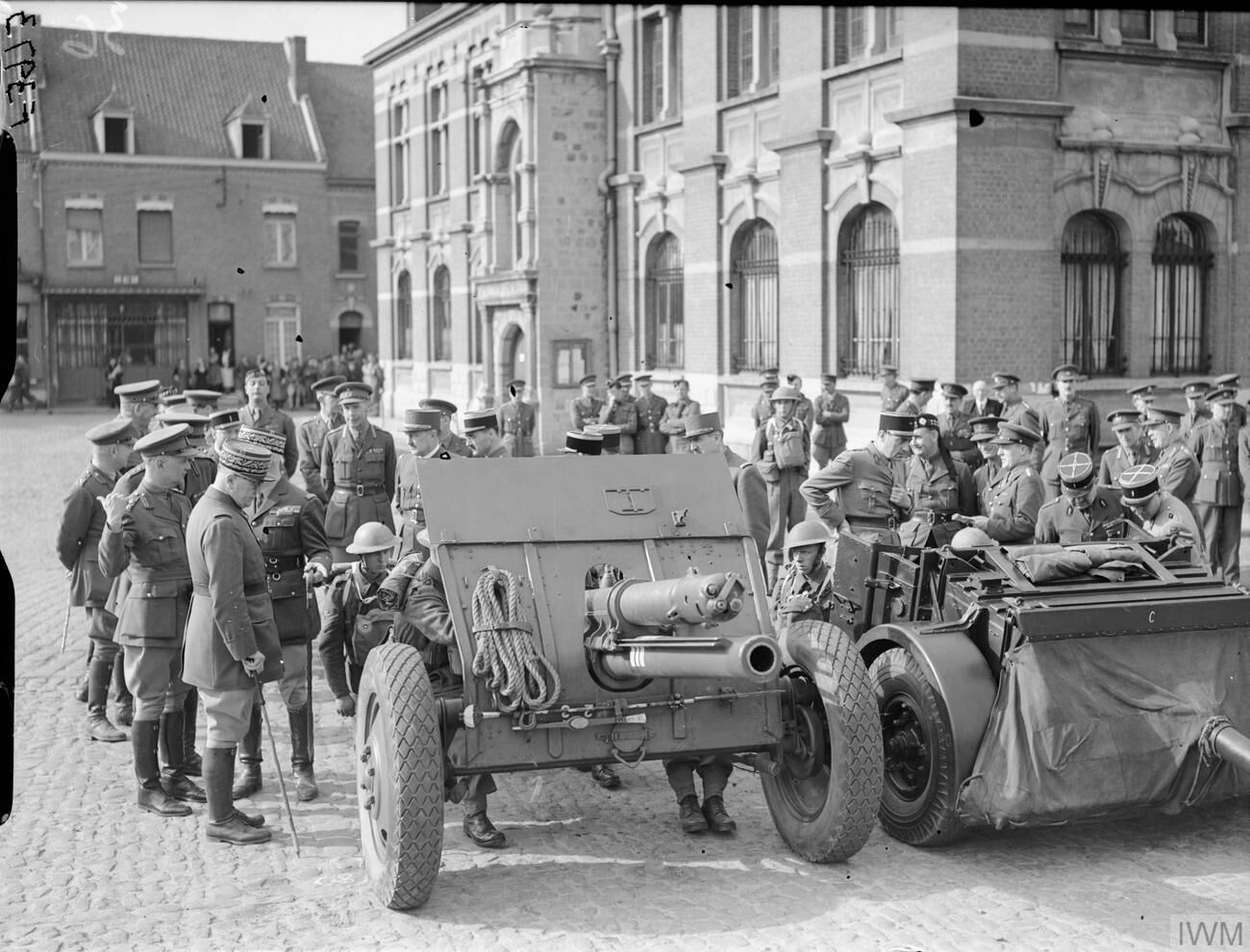
Modernised 18-pdr being inspected in France, April 1940.

==== Battle of France ====
The regiment went to Swindon in Wiltshire for intensive training before moving to France with 48th (SM) Division in January 1940 to join the British Expeditionary Force (BEF). The regiment still had 18-pdrs and 4.5-inch howitzers. When the German offensive began with the invasion of the Low Countries on 10 May, the BEF advanced into Belgium under Plan D, and soon its leading divisions were in place on the River Dyle. 68th (SM) Field Rgt crossed into Belgium on 15 May and moved up to the southern outskirts of Brussels, establishing gun positions near Waterloo on 16 May. However, the Germans had broken through in the Ardennes and the BEF was forced to retreat: the regiment was ordered to retire to Hal without having fired a shot. It accomplished this during the night along congested roads. The BEF was falling back to the line of the Escaut and on 18 May the regiment was ordered across the river to the Bois d'Houtaing a few miles to the west of Ath, where its guns were readied for action at Wez-Velvain.

On 21 May 48th (SM) Division was heavily engaged in driving back attempts to cross the river. 68th (SM) Field Rgt fired almost all day. Although it had difficulty finding suitable OP positions, and one FOO was killed, the regiment did much predicted shooting on targets indicated by its liaison officers at the infantry brigade and battalion HQs. The shrapnel from its 18-pdrs and 4.5-inch howitzers had considerable effect on the enemy infantry trying to cross. At 15.00 brigade HQ requested the regiment to lay down a 15-minute preliminary barrage for a counter-attack by a company of the 1st OBLI. This barrage was terminated early, because the attackers had already reached their objective.

However, the German breakthrough had now reached the sea and the BEF was cut off. The division was among the forces pulled out of the east-facing Escaut line to form a west-facing line along a series of canals in the Bergues–Cassel–Hazebrouck area covering the approaches to Dunkirk, where the division arrived on 25 May. Next day the decision was made to evacuate the BEF from Dunkirk (Operation Dynamo), and forces in the 'pocket' in which the BEF was now confined were progressively pulled into the Dunkirk perimeter. 48th (SM) Division held a series of delaying positions and the divisional artillery had a hard fight to get back. 68th (SM) Field Rgt was in action at Elverdinge covering the River Yser, where it fired all its ammunition, destroyed its guns, and moved into the bridgehead, embarking on 30 May.

==== Home defence ====
Formation sign of 48th (SM) Division adopted after Dunkirk.

On return to the UK, 68th (SM) Field Rgt concentrated at Presteigne in Wales and then went to Tavistock in Devon to rejoin 48th (SM) Division, which was reforming in South West England. Slowly the field artillery were re-equipped, first with extemporised guns, later with the modern Mk II 25-pounder towed by Quad tractors.

One of the lessons learned from the Battle of France was that the two-battery organisation did not work: field regiments were intended to support an infantry brigade of three battalions. As a result, they were reorganised into three 8-gun batteries, but it was not until late 1940 that the RA had enough trained battery staffs to carry out the reorganisation. 68th (SM) Field Rgt accordingly formed 447 Fd Bty by May 1941. 48th (SM) Division remained training in VIII Corps in South West England until late 1941 when it transferred to Lincolnshire in I Corps District.

From November 1941 48th (SM) Division was placed on a lower establishment, indicating that it was no longer intended for overseas service. It did, however, supply trained units to other formations. 68th (SM) Field Rgt left the division on 22 August 1942 and came under WO control preparatory to embarking for overseas service.

==== Middle East ====
68th (SM) Field Rgt landed in Iraq on 17 March 1943, where it joined Tenth Army. Tenth Army's role was to safeguard the supply route from the Persian Gulf to the Soviet Union. However, by early 1943 the German defeats at Stalingrad and in Tunisia had removed the threat. On 17 August 68th (SM) Field Rgt moved to Palestine where it came under the command of 10th Indian Infantry Division, which was reforming there after service in the Western Desert campaign.

The regiment trained with 10th Indian Division in Palestine, Syria and Egypt, before returning to Palestine on 14 November. The division was earmarked to reinforce the Allied Armies in Italy (AAI). On 15 March 1944 it moved to Egypt and embarked on 24 March.

==== Italy ====
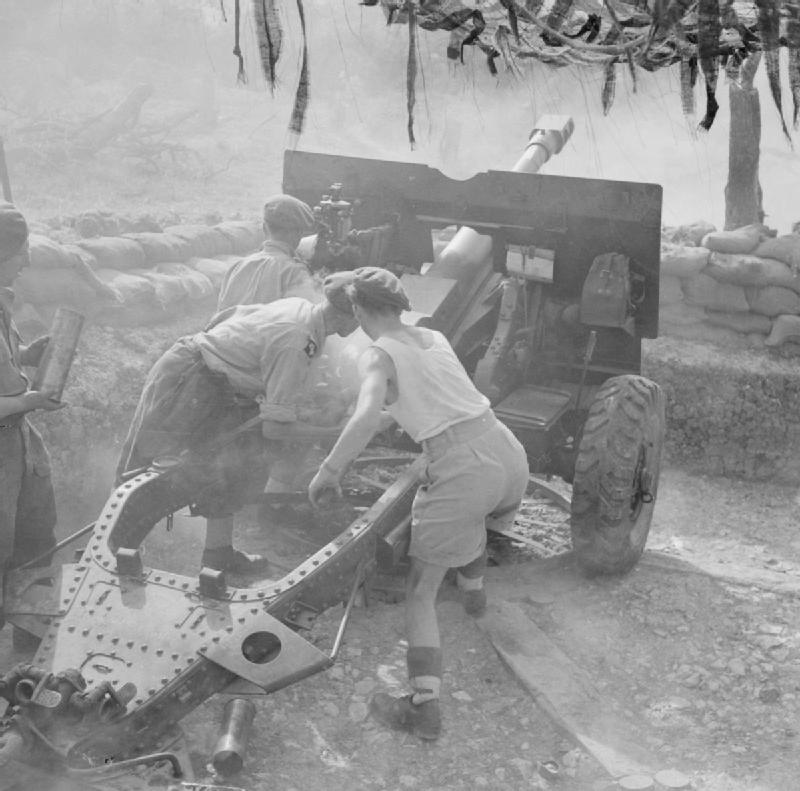
A British 25-pounder crew in action in Italy, 1944.

68th (SM) Field Rgt landed in Italy with the division on 28 March 1944. In May the Allies broke through the German Winter Line in Operation Diadem, and took Rome. By early June 10 Indian Division had concentrated under X Corps to take part in the pursuit through the mountains towards Bibbiena. The division's infantry worked their way up the Tiber Valley through scrub-covered ridges and deep ravines and then secured the mountain tops beyond, attacking usually at night. X Corps then went onto the defensive while the rest of the AAI concentrated against the Gothic Line.

In mid-September 10 Indian Division was switched to V Corps under Eighth Army on the Adriatic front, and on 6 October it crossed the headwaters of the Fiumicino (Rubicon) near Sogliano and early next morning stormed the key feature of Monte Farneto. It then continued through the hills, hustling the Germans off the ridges and turning the defended river lines in the coastal plain. However, the artillery of two divisions had to rely for supplies on a single Jeep track through the hills, and 10th Indian Division was halted once it had secured a bridgehead across the Savio at Roversano by 21 October. The division resumed its advance on 23 October, attacking out of its bridgehead and seizing a foothold on Monte Cavallo, the whole of which was then captured after dark. The Germans now pulled back hastily to the line of the Ronco, where 10th Indian Division 'bounced' two small bridgeheads on the night of 25/26 October before the defences were set. However, other formations were less successful, and with its supply lines collapsing under floods, V Corps had to close down its operations and 10th Indian Division was sent for rest.

V Corps was ordered to resume its advance at the beginning of November, 10th Indian Division leading off on 30 October because the ground dried out in front of its Ronco bridgehead first. The advance south of Forlì became rapid once an opposing infantry regiment collapsed: the German commander attributed this to the weight and accuracy of 10th Indian Division's artillery support and a complementary shortage of German artillery ammunition. But fresh rain on 2 November stalled the advance and Forlì did not fall until 9 November. The advance then continued as the Germans fell back behind a series of river lines, 10th Indian Division crossing the Montone on 25 November. Once again, heavy rain stalled the planned crossing of the Lamone next day, but 10th Indian Division attacked with heavy artillery support on 30 November, just failing to capture the German military bridge over the river before it was blown up. By the time winter ended offensive operations, V Corps had struggled forward to the line of the Senio.

For the Spring 1945 offensive in Italy (Operation Grapeshot), 10th Indian Division was assigned to XIII Corps in the Apennine Mountains. After Eighth Army had crossed the Senio and taken the Argenta Gap, the Germans in front of XIII Corps pulled out, and 10th Indian Division began a pursuit towards Budrio on 14 April. XIII Corps then took over the central sector of Eighth Army's front, and brought round the divisional artillery of 10th Indian Division to support the attack by 2nd New Zealand Division to break out of its bridgehead over the Sillaro. The attack was made at 21.00 on 15 April, supported by a barrage from seven field regiments and four medium regiments, lasting 2 hours 50 minutes and expending 40,000 rounds. The breakout was entirely successful, and an even bigger artillery concentration helped the New Zealanders across the steeply banked Gaiana stream on the evening of 18 April, causing immense devastation to the German units. 10th Indian Division and the New Zealanders wheeled north and reached the Reno on the night of 22/23 April. Next day, Eighth Army began crossing the Po. 10th Indian Division was now 'grounded', its transport taken away to help keep the spearhead formations moving as the campaign came to an end. Hostilities in the theatre ended on 29 April with the Surrender of Caserta.

68th (South Midland) Field Regiment passed into suspended animation on 31 December 1946.

=== 120th (South Midland) Field Regiment ===
Formation sign of 61st Division.

120th Field Rgt mobilised in 61st Division and remained with it throughout the war. The division never served outside the United Kingdom. Having trained in Southern Command it was sent to Northern Ireland in June 1940 during the post-Dunkirk invasion crisis, remaining there until February 1943. 120th Field Rgt formed its third battery, 485 Fd Bty, on 1 March 1941 when the regiment was stationed at Ballymoney. It was authorised to adopt its parent unit's 'South Midland' subtitle on 17 February 1942.

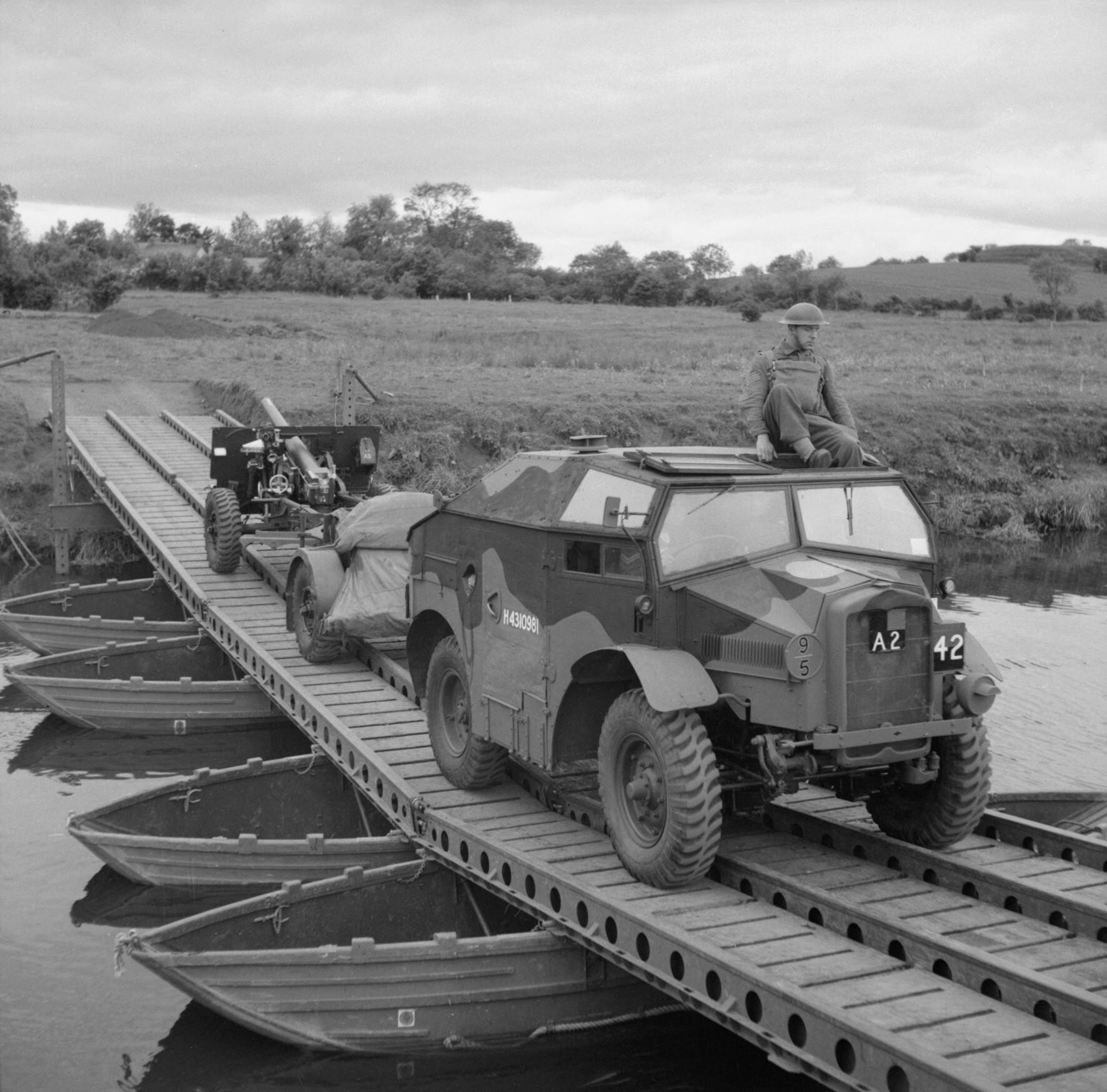
A Morris C8 Quad tractor towing a 25-pdr and limber of 61st Division during exercises in Northern Ireland

61st Division did appear in 21st Army Group's proposed order of battle in the summer of 1943, but it was later replaced by veteran formations brought back from the Mediterranean theatre before Operation Overlord was launched. It remained in reserve in the UK at full establishment.

On 1 September 1944 120th (SM) Fd Rgt transferred to 48th (SM) Division (now 48th (Reserve) Division), replacing 180th Fd Rgt, which had disbanded the previous day; 120th took over 146 Bty and the remaining personnel from 180th Fd Rgt. The regiment served in 48th (R) Division as a holding unit until the end of the war. It formed 603 Fd Bty as a holding battery on 5 December 1944. After the war, 603 Fd Bty disbanded on 1 January 1946 and 120th (South Midland) Field Regiment began entering suspended animation on 14 April 1946, completing the process by 2 May.

== Postwar ==
When the TA was reconstituted on 1 January 1947, 68th (SM) Field Rgt reformed at Stoney Lane, Sparkbrook, Birmingham, as 268 (Warwickshire) Field Regiment, while 120th reformed at Washwood Heath, Birmingham, as 320 (South Midland) Heavy Anti-Aircraft Regiment. 268 Field Rgt was part of 86 (Field) Army Group Royal Artillery (AGRA), while 320 HAA Rgt was in 92 (AA) AGRA, though that was disbanded on 9 September 1948. 320 HAA Regiment was absorbed into 495 (Birmingham) HAA Rgt on 1 January 1954.

On 1 October 1954 268 Field Rgt was converted to medium artillery, then on 31 October 1956 it amalgamated with 267 (South Midland) Fd Rgt (the other half of the old 1st Worcestershire and Warwickshire Artillery Volunteers) at Worcester to form 267 (Worcester & Warwickshire) Medium Rgt with its RHQ and Q Bty at Birmingham, and a detachment at Leamington Spa.

The TA was reorganised on 1 May 1961 after National Service was abolished. The Warwickshire (Birmingham and Leamington Spa) elements of 267 (W&W) Med Rgt combined with Q (Warwickshire) Bty of 442 Light AA Rgt and P and Q Btys of 443 (Warwickshire) LAA Rgt to form a new 268 (Warwickshire) Regiment ('Field' was restored to the title in 1964), while the Worcestershire batteries amalgamated with part of 639 (8th Battalion Worcestershire Regiment) Heavy Rgt to form a new 267 (Worcestershire) Field Rgt. The new Warwickshire unit had the following organisation:

- RHQ – ex 267 (W&W) Fd Rgt
- P Bty – ex 443 (W) LAA Rgt
- Q Bty – ex 442 LAA Rgt
- R Bty – ex 267 (W&W) Fd Rgt

When the TA was reduced into the Territorial and Army Volunteer Reserve (TAVR) in 1967 the regiment reformed as the Warwickshire Regiment, RA, in TAVR III (Home Defence), absorbing an infantry battalion of the Royal Warwickshire Fusiliers and a squadron of the Royal Corps of Transport (RCT); 48th Divisional/District Provost Company, Royal Military Police, also assisted in its formation. The new unit had the following organisation:

- RHQ – ex 268 (W) Fd Rgt
- P (68 South Midland) Bty – ex 268 (W) Fd Rgt
- Q (Royal Warwickshire Fusiliers) Bty – ex 7th Bn, Royal Warwickshire Fusiliers
- R (Warwickshire Transport) Bty – ex 516 Squadron, 48th Divisional/District Rgt, RCT

The TAVR was further reduced on 1 April 1969, when the regiment became a cadre under 35th (South Midlands) Signal Regiment, Royal Corps of Signals, with some men joining 48 (City of Birmingham) Signal Squadron at Sparkbrook in that regiment. Then on 1 April 1971 the cadre was disbanded to form X Troop in A Queen's Own Warwickshire and Worcestershire Yeomanry Squadron of The Mercian Yeomanry, when the Warwickshire artillery lineage ended.

== Honorary Colonels ==
The following served as Honorary Colonel of the unit:

- Sir Hallewell Rogers, former Lord Mayor of Birmingham and later MP for Birmingham Moseley, appointed 10 October 1913.
- Col A. Constantine, TD, former commanding officer, appointed 6 July 1929
- Brig-Gen Lord Henry Seymour, DSO and Bar, appointed 3 November 1934, died 8 June 1939.
- Col Frank Allday, OBE, TD, appointed 1 April 1967

== Memorials ==
Memorials to the men of III South Midland Brigade who died during the First World War and those of 68th (South Midland) Field Regiment who died in France and Belgium, Iraq and the Middle East, and in Italy during the Second World War, were erected at the Drill Hall at Stoney Lane. They were repositioned in the new Montgomery House Army Reserve Centre that replaced it in 1988.
