= Aveluy Communal Cemetery Extension =

WWI CWGC cemetery in Somme, France

Aveluy Communal Commonwealth War Graves Commission Cemetery Extension
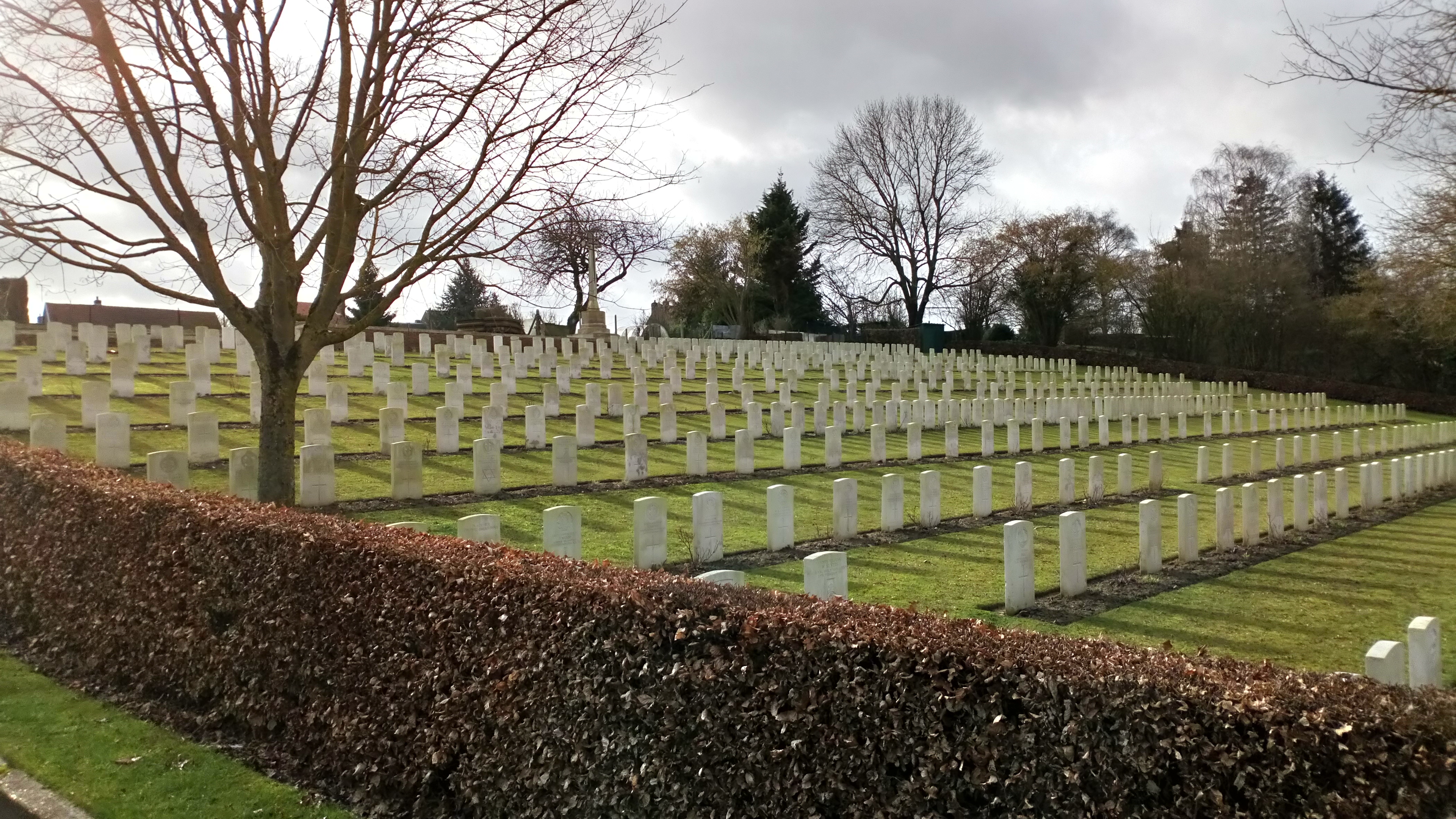
- Graves at Aveluy

Details
- Established: 1915
- Location: Aveluy, Somme, France
- Country: French, British
- Coordinates: 50.0246°N 2.6568°E
- Type: Military
- No. of graves: 613 total, 589 identified
- Website: cwgc.org
- Find a Grave: Aveluy Communal Commonwealth War Graves Commission Cemetery Extension

The Aveluy Communal Cemetery Extension is a cemetery located in the Somme region of France commemorating French and British Commonwealth troops who fought in the Battle of the Somme in World War I. The cemetery honors mainly soldiers who died holding the line near the village of Aveluy from slightly before July 1915 to 26 March 1918.

== Location ==
The cemetery is located just off of the D20 road in the village of Aveluy, which is itself a short distance north of Albert, France.

== Fighting near Aveluy ==
The front near Aveluy was held by the French until August 1915, until it was transferred into Commonwealth control. The British held the line until 27 March 1918, when the Germans overran Aveluy in their final Offensive on the Somme. The village was retaken by the British in August 1918.

== Establishment ==
=== History ===
The cemetery was begun by the French and was transferred into Commonwealth jurisdiction along with the rest of the line. It was used by fighting units and field ambulances, most notably the 3rd and 9th Casualty Clearing Stations, who used the cemetery until November 1917. The cemetery extension was designed by Sir Reginald Blomfield.

=== Statistics ===
The cemetery contains a total of 613 graves, with 589 of them identified and 26 unidentified. 3 memorials commemorate graves that could not be located from their original burial site.

Identifiable Burials by Nationality
Nationality	Number of Burials
United Kingdom	525
Australia	54
Canada	7
India	2
South Africa	1

Number of Burials by Unit
Royal Engineers	56	Australian units	55
Royal Field Artillery	40	Highland Light Infantry	26
Northamptonshire Regiment	24	Royal Fusiliers - City of London Regiment	22
Lancashire Fusiliers	21	Royal Garrison Artillery	18
Rifle Brigade	17	Border Regiment	15
Loyal North Lancashire Regiment	15	West Yorkshire Regiment	15
King's Own Yorkshire Light Infantry	14	Cameronians - Scottish Rifles	13
Devonshire Regiment	13	Royal Berkshire Regiment	11
Northumberland Fusiliers	10	Royal Sussex Regiment	10
Middlesex Regiment	9	Norfolk Regiment	9
Queen's - Royal West Surrey Regiment	9	Royal West Kent Regiment - Queen's Own	8
Seaforth Highlanders	8	Buffs - East Kent Regiment	7
Canadian units	7	10th Hussars	7
Lincolnshire Regiment	7	King's Liverpool Regiment	6
Royal Irish Rifles	6	Essex Regiment	5
Gloucestershire Regiment	5	King's Own Royal Lancaster Regiment	5
Royal Warwickshire Regiment	5	South Wales Borderers	5
Army Cyclist Corps	4	Queen's Own Yorkshire Dragoons	4
Royal Scots	4	York & Lancaster Regiment	4
Black Watch - Royal Highlanders	3	East Lancashire Regiment	3
Gordon Highlanders	3	King's Royal Rifle Corps	3
Machine Gun Corps - Infantry	3	Royal Army Medical Corps	3
Royal Army Service Corps	3	Royal Inniskilling Fusiliers	3
South Lancashire Regiment	3	South Staffordshire Regiment	3
Sherwood Foresters - Notts. & Derbys Regiment	3	Argyll & Sutherland Highlanders	2
Duke of Cornwall's Light Infantry	2	Duke of Wellington - West Riding Regiment	2
East Surrey Regiment	2	East Yorkshire Regiment	2
Indian Labour Corps	2	Suffolk Regiment	2
Welch Regiment	2	Wiltshire Regiment	2
Worcestershire Regiment	2	Cheshire Regiment	1
Dorsetshire Regiment	1	General List	1
Glasgow Yeomanry	1	Green Howards - Yorkshire Regiment	1
King's Shropshire Light Infantry	1	22nd Bn. London Regiment - The Queen's	1
2nd Lothian - Border Horse	1	Manchester Regiment	1
Oxfordshire & Buckinghamshire Light Infantry	1	Royal Naval Division	1
Royal Welsh Fusiliers	1	Second Life Guards	1
South African Labour Corps	1		
