= Meteren =

- Village
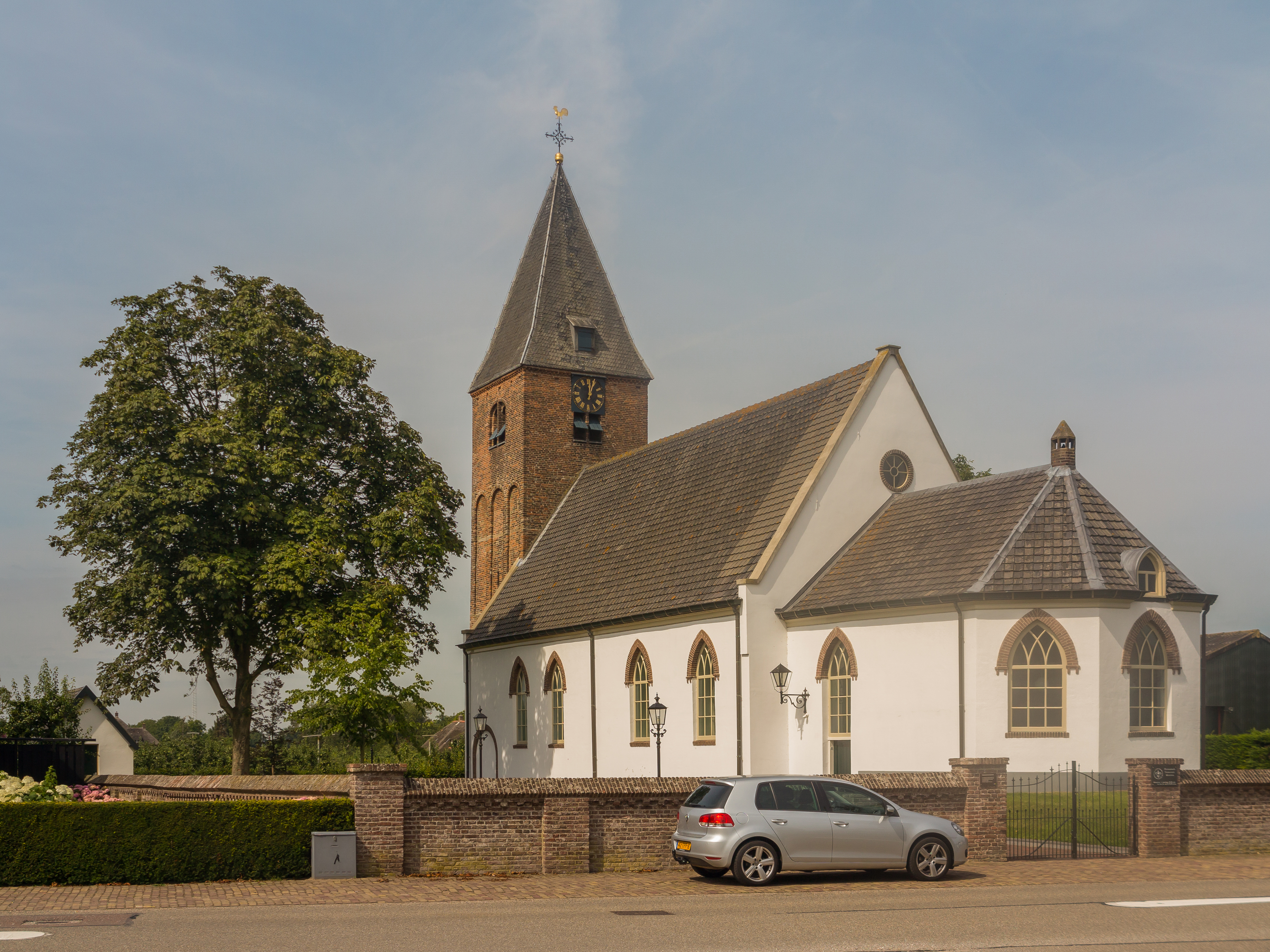
- Dutch Reformed Church

- Flag Coat of arms

- Location in the Netherlands Meteren (Netherlands)
- Coordinates: 51.86391°N 5.28246°E
- Country: Netherlands
- Province: Gelderland
- Municipality: West Betuwe

Area
  - Total: 7.14 km^{2} (2.76 sq mi)
- Elevation: 3 m (9.8 ft)

Population (2022)
  - Total: 5,398
  - Density: 756/km^{2} (1,960/sq mi)
- Time zone: UTC+1 (CET)
  - Summer (DST): UTC+2 (CEST)
- Postal code: 4194
- Dialing code: 0345

Meteren is a village in the Dutch province of Gelderland. It is a part of the municipality of West Betuwe, and lies about 10 km west of Tiel.

== History ==
It was first mentioned in 1133 as Methre. The etymology is unclear. The village developed in to a round esdorp. The tower of the Dutch Reformed Church dates from the 15th century and possibly has 14th century elements. The church itself is medieval, but was considerably altered in 1837 and around 1875. In 1840, it was home to 529 people.

== Gallery ==
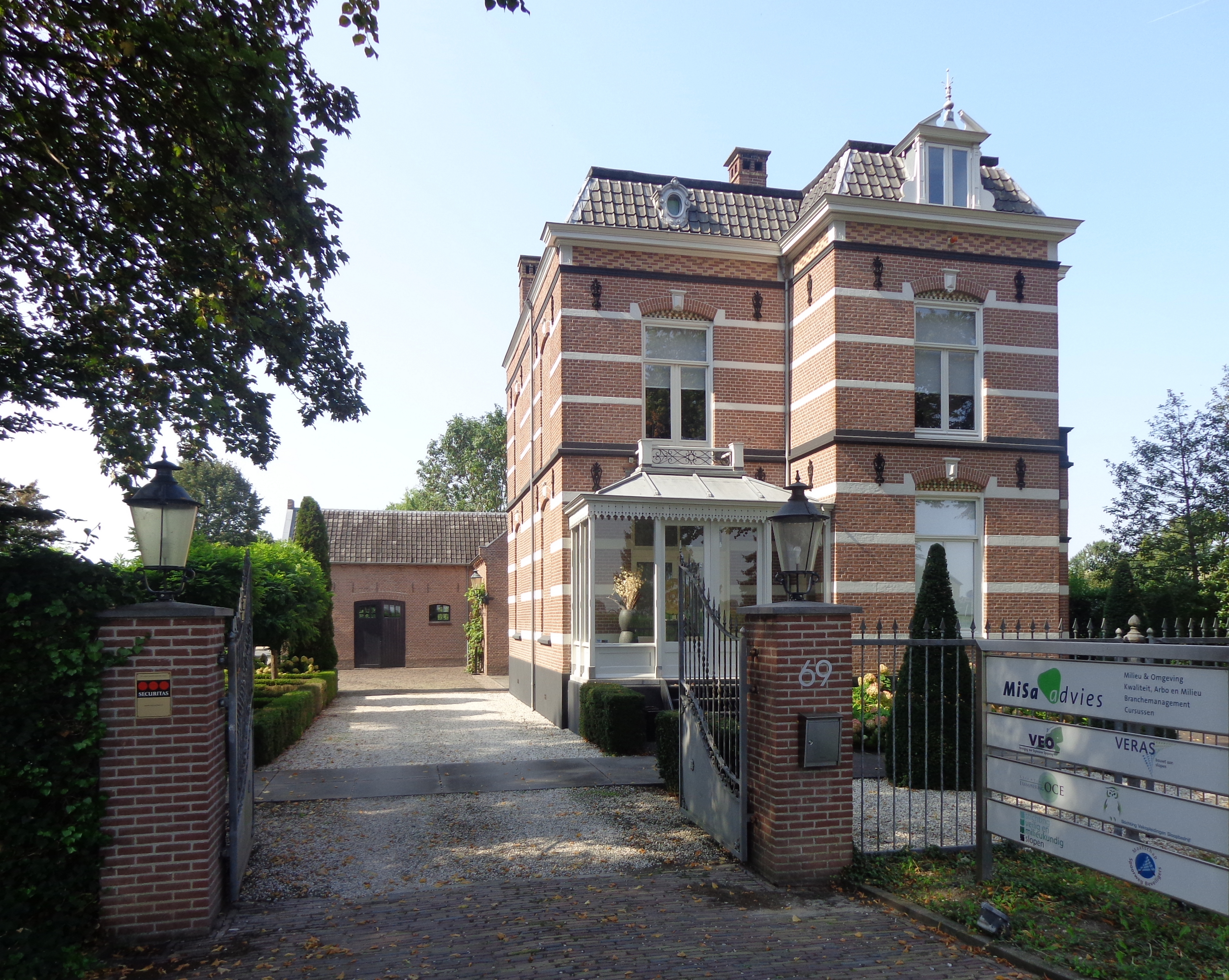
House in Meteren

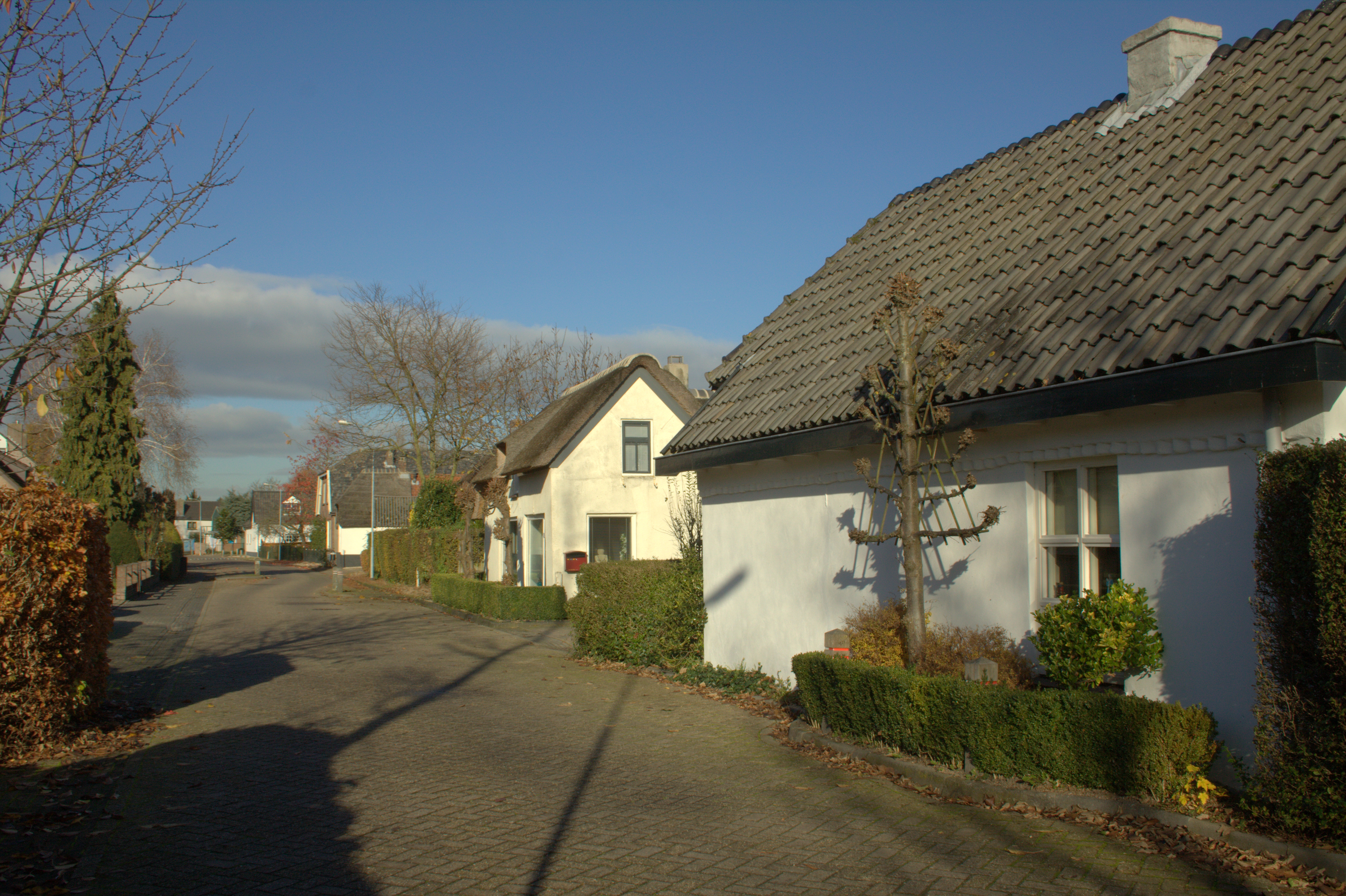
Street view

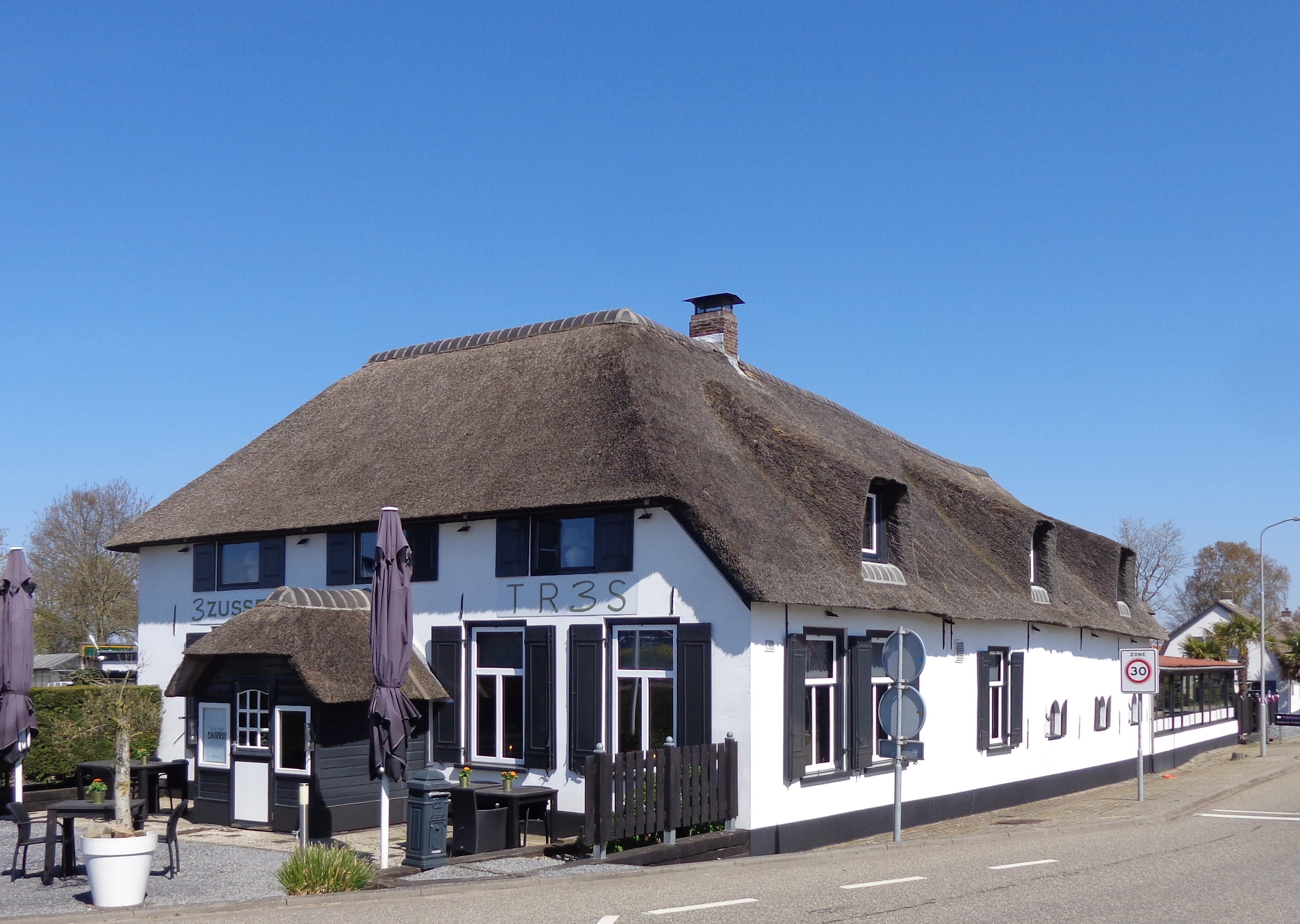
Restaurant in Meteren

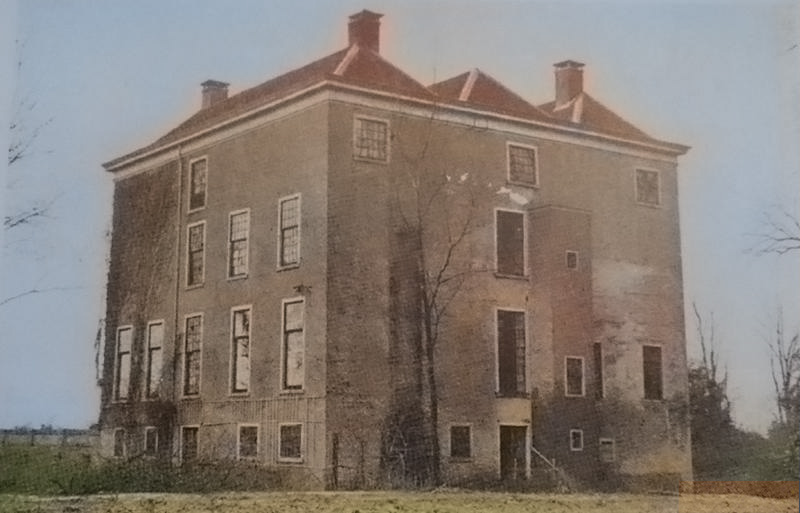
Huis Meteren before demolition (1907)
