= Saint-Ouen, Somme =

Saint-Ouen
- Commune
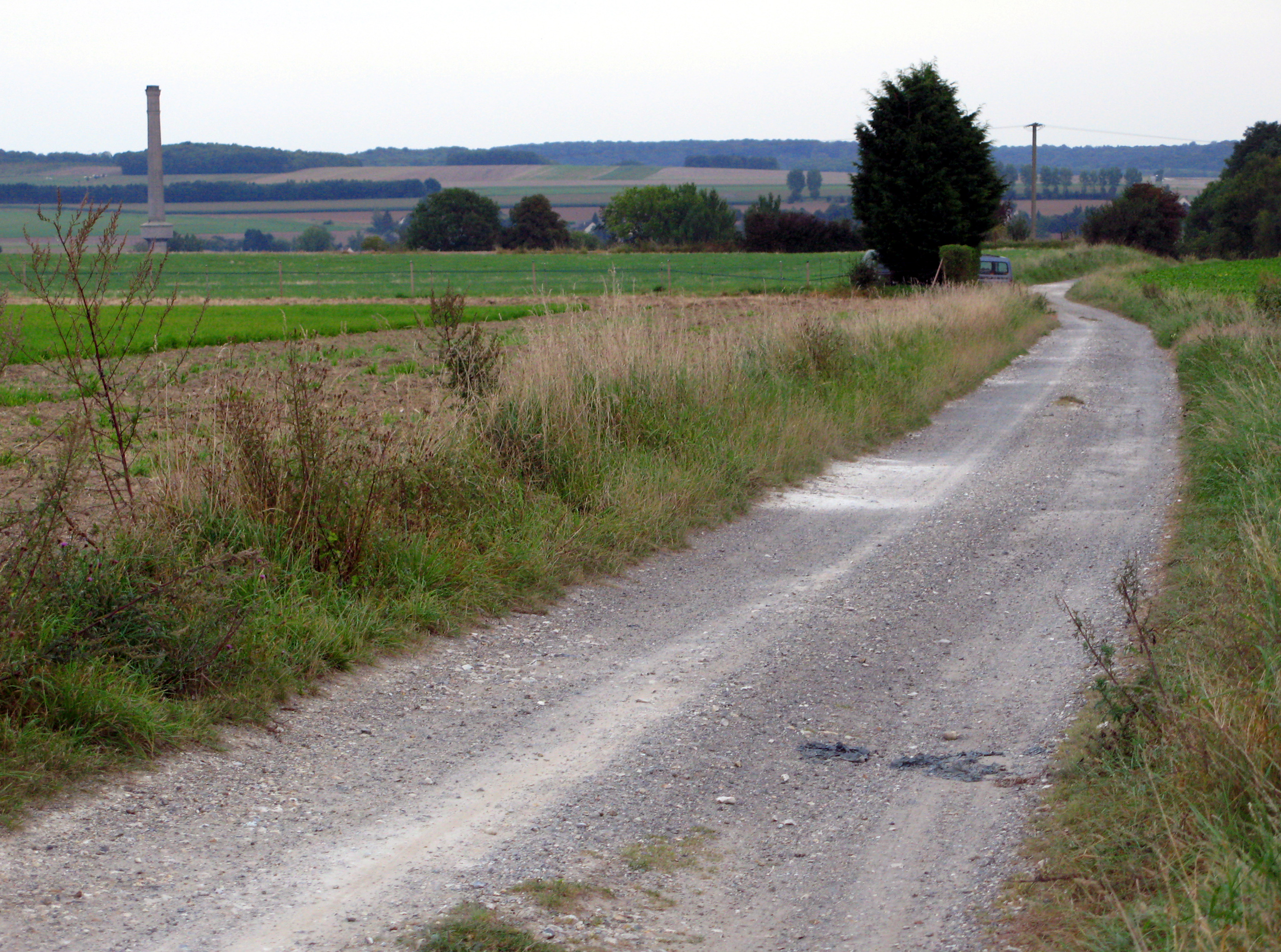
- Route of the old Roman road
- Location of Saint-Ouen
- Location within France Location within Hauts-de-France
- Coordinates: 50°02′15″N 2°07′22″E
- Country: France
- Region: Hauts-de-France
- Department: Somme
- Arrondissement: Amiens
- Canton: Flixecourt
- Intercommunality: CC Nièvre et Somme

Government
  - Mayor (2020–2026): Sylvie De Almeida
- Area^{1}: 4.35 km^{2} (1.68 sq mi)
- Elevation: 29 m (95 ft)
- Highest elevation: 110 m (360 ft)
- Lowest elevation: 19 m (62 ft)
- Population (2023): 1,772
  - Density: 407/km^{2} (1,060/sq mi)
- Time zone: UTC+01:00 (CET)
  - Summer (DST): UTC+02:00 (CEST)
- INSEE/Postal code: 80711 /80610
- ^{1} French Land Register data, which excludes lakes, ponds, glaciers > 1 km^{2} (0.386 sq mi or 247 acres) and river estuaries.

Saint-Ouen (French pronunciation: [sɛ̃.t‿wɛ̃]; Picard: Saint-Ouin) is a commune in the Somme department in Hauts-de-France in northern France.

== Geography ==
The commune is situated 14 miles (23 km) northwest of Amiens, at the D159 and D57 junction, in the valley of the Nièvre and about a mile from the A16 autoroute. The old Roman road, the Chaussée Brunehaut passes through the middle of the commune.

== Population ==
Historical population
Year	Pop.	±% p.a.
1968	2,106	—
1975	2,047	−0.41%
1982	2,011	−0.25%
1990	2,186	+1.05%
1999	2,196	+0.05%
2007	2,060	−0.80%
2012	2,024	−0.35%
2017	1,907	−1.18%
2023	1,772	−1.22%
Source: INSEE

== Personalities ==
Alfred Manessier, (1911–1993). Artist, was born and buried at Saint-Ouen,

== See also ==
- Communes of the Somme department
