= 1st Worcestershire Artillery Volunteers =

1st Worcestershire Artillery Volunteers II South Midland Brigade, RFA 67th (South Midland) Field Regiment, RA 267th (Worcestershire & Warwickshire) Medium Regiment, RA The Worcestershire Territorial Regiment, RA 214 (Worcestershire) Battery, RA
- Active: 6 June 1865–present
- Country: United Kingdom
- Branch: Volunteer Force/Territorial Army
- Role: Garrison artillery Position artillery Field artillery Medium artillery
- Part of: 48th (South Midland) Division
- Garrison/HQ: Worcester
- Engagements: World War I: Somme; Fromelles; Third Ypres; Cambrai; Italy; Spring Offensive; Hundred Days Offensive; World War II: France and Dunkirk; Tunisia; Anzio; Gothic Line

The 1st Worcestershire Artillery Volunteers was a part-time unit of Britain's Royal Artillery dating back to 1865. As part of the Territorial Force it served on the Western Front and in Italy during World War I. In World War II it served in the Battle of France and was evacuated from Dunkirk. It later fought in Tunisia and Italy. After a series of postwar mergers, it continues as a battery in today's British Army Reserve.

== Volunteer Force ==
The enthusiasm for the Volunteer movement following an invasion scare in 1859 saw the creation of many Volunteer Corps composed of part-time soldiers eager to supplement the Regular British Army in time of need. One such unit was the 1st Worcestershire Artillery Volunteer Corps (AVC) formed at Worcester on 6 June 1865 under the command of Henry M. Turnor replaced as Captain Commandant on 16 February 1867 by William Stallard. Initially, the new unit was attached to the 1st Administrative Brigade, Cheshire Artillery Volunteer Corps, (Note: In Royal Artillery terminology, a 'brigade' was a group of independent batteries grouped together for administrative rather than tactical purposes, the officer in command normally being a lieutenant-colonel rather than a brigadier-general or major-general, the ranks usually associated with command of an infantry or cavalry brigade.) then briefly to the 1st Administrative Brigade, Staffordshire Artillery Volunteers before returning to the Cheshire brigade. It was increased to one and a half batteries on 17 February 1869, and from June that year was attached to a new 1st Shropshire Administrative Brigade. The 1st Worcester AVC formed a second battery on 29 April 1871 and a third on 16 November that year. From November 1873 it was attached to the 1st Monmouthshire AVC, which the following year became an administrative brigade in its own right. However, by 1878 the 1st Monmouth AVC was down to just two batteries, so the brigade was renamed the 1st Administrative Brigade, Worcestershire Artillery Volunteers, with its headquarters (HQ) moving to Worcester. William Stallard was promoted to lieutenant colonel to command it.

When the Volunteers were consolidated into larger units in 1880 the brigade became the 1st Worcester (Worcester & Monmouth) Artillery Volunteers on 16 March, with the following organisation:

- HQ, Nos 1, 2 and 4 Batteries at Worcester
- No 3 Battery at Malvern
- Nos 5 and 6 Batteries at Balsall Heath
- Nos 7 and 8 Batteries (ex 1st Monmouth) at Griffithstown
- Malvern College Cadet Corps formed 1884

The unit became part of the Welsh Division of the Royal Artillery (RA) from 1 April 1882. By July that year it had 10 batteries and they were increased to 12 on 24 May 1884. Over the next few years recruitment picked up again in Monmouthshire and by 1890 that county's artillery volunteers were strong enough to reform their own corps (the 1st Monmouthshire AVC) on 4 October. The 1st Worcester dropped its 'Worcester & Monmouth' subtitle and began recruiting in Warwickshire: by 1892 it was listed as the 1st Worcestershire and Warwickshire Volunteer Artillery with eight garrison companies. When the RA's divisional structure was reorganised on 1 July 1889, the unit joined the Southern Division.

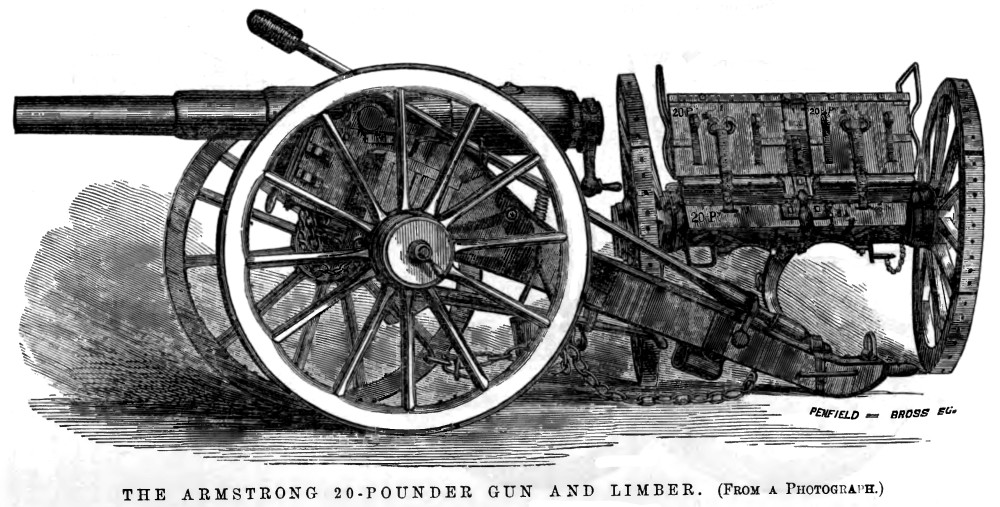
20-Pounder Armstrong RBL gun and limber.

As well as manning fixed garrison artillery, some of the early Artillery Volunteers manned semi-mobile 'position batteries' of smooth-bore field guns pulled by agricultural horses. But the War Office (WO) refused to pay for the upkeep of field guns for Volunteers and they had largely died out in the 1870s. Later the 'position artillery' concept was revived and some Volunteer companies were reorganised as position batteries to work alongside the Volunteer infantry brigades. On 14 July 1892 six of the 1st Worcestershire and Warwickshire VA's eight garrison companies were reorganised into three position batteries and by 30 September 1894 the remainder had converted, giving the following organisation:

- HQ and No 1 Bty at Worcester
- No 2 Bty at Malvern, Kidderminster and Worcester
- Nos 3 and 4 Btys at Balsall Heath

In 1897 the 1st Worcestershire & Warwickshire VA were photographed manning 20-pounder Rifled Breech-Loading guns at their annual camp. By 1900 the Warwickshire elements of the brigade at Balsall Heath had expanded enough to form their own corps, the 1st Warwickshire Volunteer Artillery on 30 May; the 1st Worcesters continued with four position batteries, redesignated 'heavy artillery' in May 1902. From 1 June 1899 all the Volunteer artillery units had become part of the Royal Garrison Artillery (RGA) and with the abolition of the RA's divisional organisation on 1 January 1902, the unit became the 1st Worcestershire Royal Garrison Artillery (Volunteers). By then its HQ was established at Southfield Street, Worcester.

== Territorial Force ==
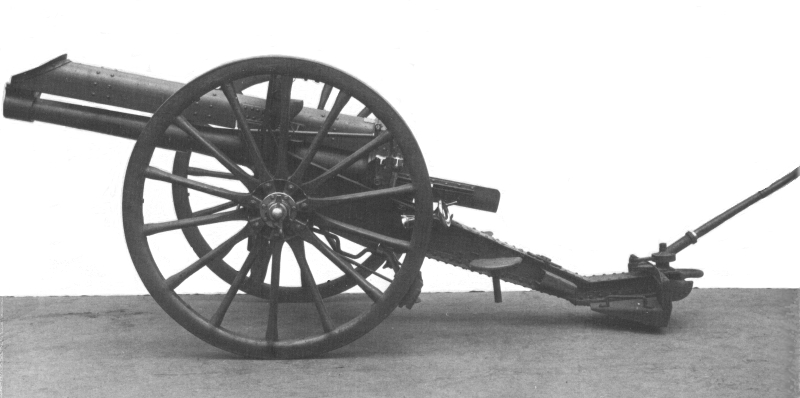
15-pounder gun issued to TF field batteries.

When the Volunteer Force was subsumed into the new Territorial Force (TF) under the Haldane Reforms of 1908, the unit became the II (or 2nd) South Midland Brigade, Royal Field Artillery (TF) with the following organisation: (Note: Originally the Worcester unit was to have been the III (or 3rd) South Midland Bde, but this was changed to II (2nd) by May 1908.)

- Brigade HQ at 24 Southfield Street, Worcester
- 1st Worcestershire Battery at Southfield Street
- 2nd Worcestershire Battery
  - Battery HQ and Left Section at 47 George Street, Kidderminster,
  - Right Section at Drill Hall, Clarence Road, Malvern
- 3rd Worcestershire Battery at Easemore Road, Redditch
- II South Midland Brigade Ammunition Column at Clarence Road, Malvern

The Malvern College Cadet Corps became part of the Junior Division of the Officers' Training Corps.

The brigade formed part of the divisional artillery for the TF's South Midland Division and was equipped with four 15-pounder field guns to each battery.

== World War I ==
=== Mobilisation ===
On the outbreak of war in August 1914 the units of the South Midland Division had just set out for annual training when orders recalled them to their home depots for mobilisation. II South Midland Bde mobilised at Worcester on 5 August under Lt-Col E.C. Bullock, who had commanded it since 27 July 1912. The division then concentrated around Chelmsford in Essex where it formed part of Central Force, with II South Midland Bde at Ingatestone.

On 10 August, TF units were invited to volunteer for Overseas Service. On 15 August 1914, the WO issued instructions to separate those men who had opted for Home Service only, and form these into reserve units. On 31 August, the formation of a reserve or 2nd Line unit was authorised for each 1st Line unit where 60 per cent or more of the men had volunteered for Overseas Service. The titles of these 2nd Line units would be the same as the original, but distinguished by a '2/' prefix and would absorb the flood of volunteers coming forwards. In this way duplicate batteries, brigades and divisions were created, mirroring those TF formations being sent overseas.

=== 1/II South Midland Brigade ===
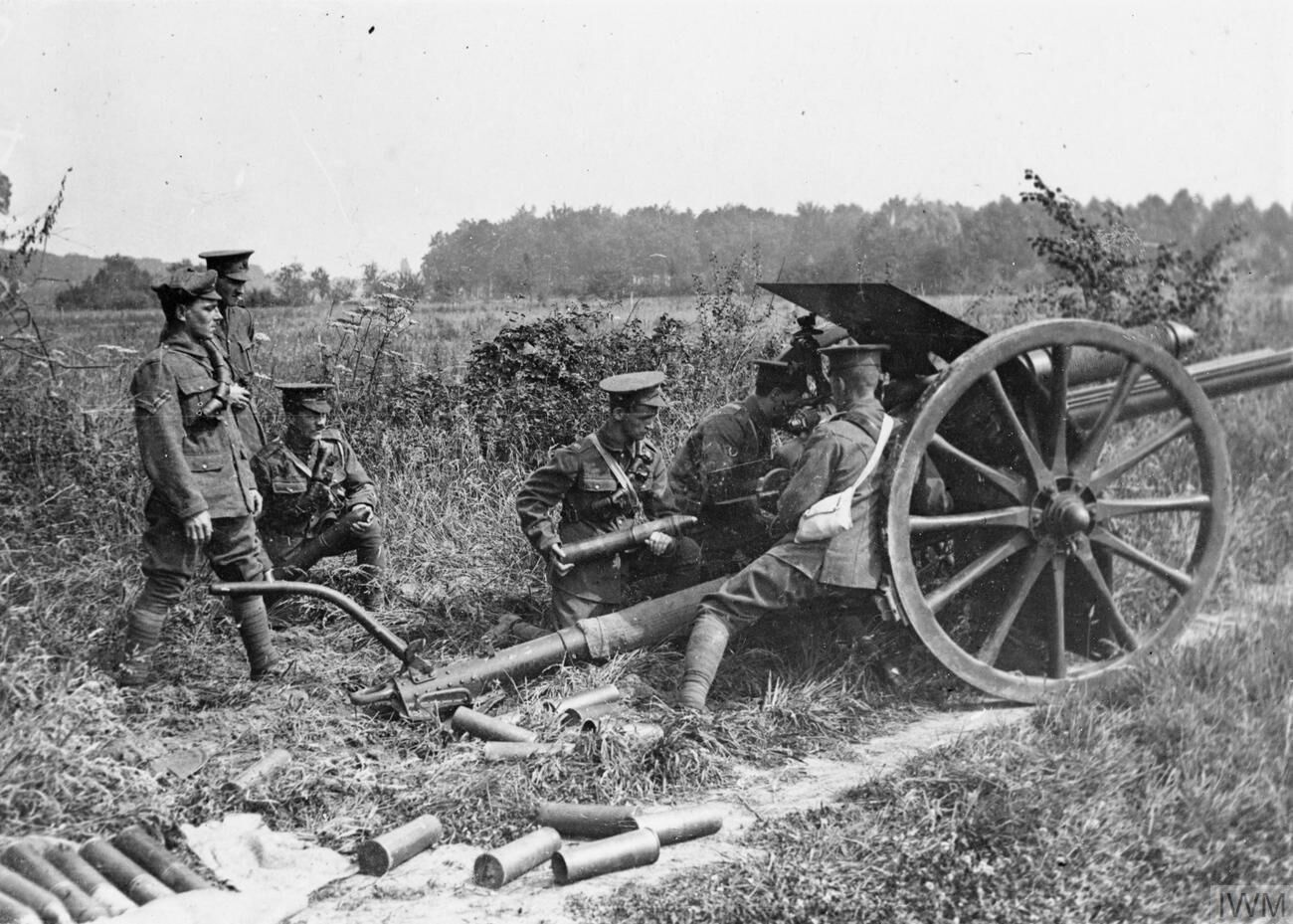
18-pounder in action on the Somme.

The training of 1st South Midland Division proceeded satisfactorily, and it was selected for service on the Western Front. Orders arrived on 13 March 1915 and II South Midland Bde entrained on 29 and 30 March for Southampton, where it embarked on the transports City of Dunkirk, Munich and Archimedes, landing at Le Havre on 31 March. By 3 April the division had concentrated near Cassel, and II South Midland Bde's batteries were attached to the Regular RFA brigades of 6th Division in the Armentières sector for introduction to frontline procedures. The batteries were allocated a small number of shells for registering the guns. Then on 15 April the brigade took over its own section of front. On 12 May the division was designated the 48th (South Midland) Division. On 21 July 1/II South Midland Bde was re-equipped with modern 18-pounder guns. It then went back into the line near Authie in the Somme sector, where 48th (SM) Division joined a new Third Army.

Lieutenant-Col Bullock retired to the TF Reserve on 14 March 1916, having been Mentioned in dispatches, and was succeeded as commanding officer (CO) by Lt-Col J.R. Colville, a Regular officer. On the night of 23/24 March 1/II South Midland Bde fired shrapnel and high explosive (HE) barrages to support a major trench raid by 143rd (Warwickshire) Infantry Bde. 1/II South Midland Bde formed an additional battery, D Worcester Bty, on 3 April, a number of the men being transferred to it from the Brigade Ammunition Column (BAC), which was abolished and merged into the Divisional Ammunition Column as its 2nd Section on 15 May. Then on 18 May the brigade was redesignated CCXLI (or 241st) Brigade (Note: The brigade continued to refer to itself as '241 (South Midland) Brigade', and is referred to in the RA history as '241st (Worcester) Brigade'.) and the old batteries became A, B and C. At the same time D Bty transferred to CCXLIII (IV South Midland) Bde in exchange for 5th Warwickshire Howitzer Bty, equipped with four 4.5-inch howitzers, which became D (H) Bty.

==== Somme ====
After a long period of low-level Trench warfare, 48th (SM) Division's first offensive operation was in the Battle of the Somme. The bombardment began on 24 June and D (H) Bty took part. The 18-pdr batteries moved into prepared positions close behind the line on 28 June ready for the attack planned for next day, but Z Day was delayed by two days while the bombardment continued and the brigade stood fast. The battle was launched on 1 July 1916. Most of 48th (SM) Division was in reserve, only two battalions being engaged, but the brigade fired in support of 29th Division, with Lt-Col Colville acting as artillery liaison officer to 87th Infantry Bde. A Battery fired on Beaucourt Chateau in the final round of bombardment from 06.25 to H Hour at 07.30, when the infantry went 'over the top', then B and C Btys opened fire as part of the Creeping barrage at 07.30. 87th Brigade assaulted 'Y Ravine', but found that the long bombardment by 29th Divisional Artillery (DA) had failed to cut much of the barbed wire hidden in hollows. The attack crumpled in the face of unsuppressed German machine guns and was over by 08.05. A Battery was ordered to resume firing for a second assault, but this also failed and 29th Division stopped its attacks at 15.00. B and C Batteries had ceased fire at 09.30, expecting to move up, but D (H) Bty continued firing all day.

Orders for 48th (SM) Division to resume the attacks next day were cancelled. While D Bty's howitzers continued firing in support of other formations, the rest of CCXLI Bde was pulled out, A Bty being heavily shelled as it did so on the night of 3/4 July. The division carried out various feint attacks, on 7 July and again on 14 July before the Battle of Bazentin Ridge. Then on 21 July CCXLI Bde was attached to 49th (West Riding) Division during the Battle of Pozières Ridge, mainly carrying out harassing fire (HF) tasks on enemy communications at night. D (H) Battery remained in 'Mash Valley' on detachment to other formations. Between 2 and 8 August Brigade HQ progressively took over command of the Right Group of 49th (WR) DA, which included the whole of CCXLV Bde and C/CCXLVIII Bty as well as its own A and C Btys. The guns continued night firing, particularly on the night of 9/10 August when they laid down a barrage to isolate 'Leipzig Salient', for which 49th (WR) Division had been battling for a month. On 15 August the brigade bombarded Mouquet Farm ('Mucky Farm') to help 4th Australian Division's attack. Then on 18 August 48th (SM) Division took up the attack, again helped by the field artillery isolating the objectives with continuous well-placed barrages. On 21 August 48th (SM) and 25th Division attacked again in the Leipzig Salient area behind an 'excellent barrage'. A follow-up attack by 7th Bde of 25th Division on 24 August, covered by 'Right Group' succeeded in capturing 'Hindenburg Trench' across the rear of the Leipzig Salient 'in fine style'. 49th (WR) Divisional Artillery loaned its Right Group (including HQ, A and C Btys of CCXLI Bde) to 25th Division for an attempt on 28 August to clear the new German frontline trench behind the Leipzig salient, but this was an expensive failure. Meanwhile, C Bty had returned to the wagon lines to relocate, and D (H) Bty had moved from Mash Valley to Aveluy Wood.

Fighting continued on Pozières Ridge into September. On 3 September all batteries of CCXLI Bde were engaged: A & B supporting a failed attack by 75th Bde of 25th Division on 'Turk Trench' near Mucky Farm, C & D (H) covering 49th (WR) Division's attack north of Thiepval, which succeeded in capturing 'Fabeck Graben'. From 6 September Brigade HQ with A and D (H) Btys came under tactical command of 32nd Bde of 11th (Northern) Division, which captured the 'Wonder Work' on 14 September. 147th (West Riding) Bde of 49th (WR) Division then took over again for the follow-up attack on 16 September. CCXLI Brigade HQ was relieved on 18 September, but the batteries remained in action, with D (H) preparing positions on the railway at Pozières. All the batteries fired in support of the attack on Thiepval on 26 September. Over the following days the Germans counter-attacked strongly, attempting to recapture 'Stuff Redoubt' and the 'Schwaben Redoubt', and the batteries suffered a number of casualties before they were relieved on the night of 30 September.

The batteries left their guns in position to be taken over by their relieving batteries, and collected others from the gun lines of the 18th and 49th Divisions before moving to new positions at Sailly-au-Bois, arriving on 5 October. CCXLI Brigade rejoined its parent division and was designated Right Group of 48th (SM) DA, with A and B Btys of CCXL Bde as well as its own 18-pdr batteries. The brigade spent a quiet few weeks carrying out registration and wire cutting shoots. On 18 October 48th (SM) DA was reorganised, with CCXLIII Bde being broken up to bring the rest of the 18-pdr batteries up to a strength of six guns each. Thereafter CCXLI Bde had the following organisation:

- A Bty + A subsection B/CCXLIII (ex D Worcester Bty, see above) + C Subsection C/CCXLIII (ex D Warwickshire Bty)
- B Bty + C subsection B/CCXLIII + D Subsection C/CCXLIII
- C Bty + B & D subsections B/CCXLIII
- D (H) Bty

==== Winter 1916–17 ====
The divisional sector continued quiet, apart from a heavy German bombardment early on the morning of 22 October, when they attempted to raid the British lines at Hébuterne. The guns also supported British raids. On 13 November the brigade fired a barrage to protect the flank of Fifth Army's attack on Beaumont-Hamel (the Battle of the Ancre). Next day D (H) Bty fired smoke shells to cover the continuing operations. Thereafter normal trench routine continued, with occasional Box barrages fired to support British trench raids. The brigade was relieved at the end of November and moved back to Pozières (later Contalmaison), with the battery positions at Martinpuich. It went to rest billets in mid-December, then on 30 and 31 December its gunners relieved CCXL Bde at their guns at Bazentin-le-Petit Cemetery. On 16 January a section joined from C (H) Bty of CCXLII Bde to bring D Bty up to six howitzers.

Although the sector was quiet during January 1917, the guns continued firing by day and night, registering targets or exchanging fire with enemy batteries. At the end of the month the brigade took over positions in front of Péronne from the French. On 14 March the Germans began withdrawing to the Hindenburg Line (Operation Alberich) and on 18 March 48th (SM) Division liberated Péronne. CCXLI Brigade began moving up next day, a section of C Bty being ferried across the Somme river and canal on pontoons, followed by the rest of the battery. The division followed the retiring enemy with a mobile column while the engineers replaced destroyed bridges and railways, the batteries taking up successive positions. From 30 March CCXLI Bde fired barrages in support of 48th (SM) Division's operations against the Hindenburg Line outposts round Épehy, which continued until 4 April. The brigade then took up positions at Templeux-la-Fosse, with two batteries of CCXI Bde (newly arrived from Egypt with 42nd (East Lancashire) Division) under its command. Skirmishes against the German outposts continued for some weeks and the guns were edged forwards to bring the Hindenburg Line into range. By early May brigade HQ had moved up to Tincourt. On 16 May the brigade moved north to Beaulencourt and its batteries (together with some attached Australian batteries) were deployed across the Bapaume–Cambrai road. At the end of June the brigade was sent for rest.

==== Ypres ====
In July 48th (SM) Division was sent north to rejoin Fifth Army for the forthcoming Third Ypres Offensive. It was in reserve when the offensive opened on 31 July, but took part in the Battle of Langemarck (16 August) Although this attack was disastrous overall, the artillery support for 48th (SM) Division was good and it captured some ground before being held up by a group of fortified farms. On 20 August the division took advantage of a spell of dry weather to attack the troublesome strongpoints that had held them up: 'Hillock Farm', 'Maison du Hibou', 'Triangle Farm' and 'The Cockcroft'. Seven tanks moved up the firm St Julien–Poelcapelle road covered by a smoke and shrapnel barrage, with a High Explosive (HE) barrage ahead, and subdued the strongpoints that were then captured by infantry platoons. A repeat of this attack two days later was less successful.

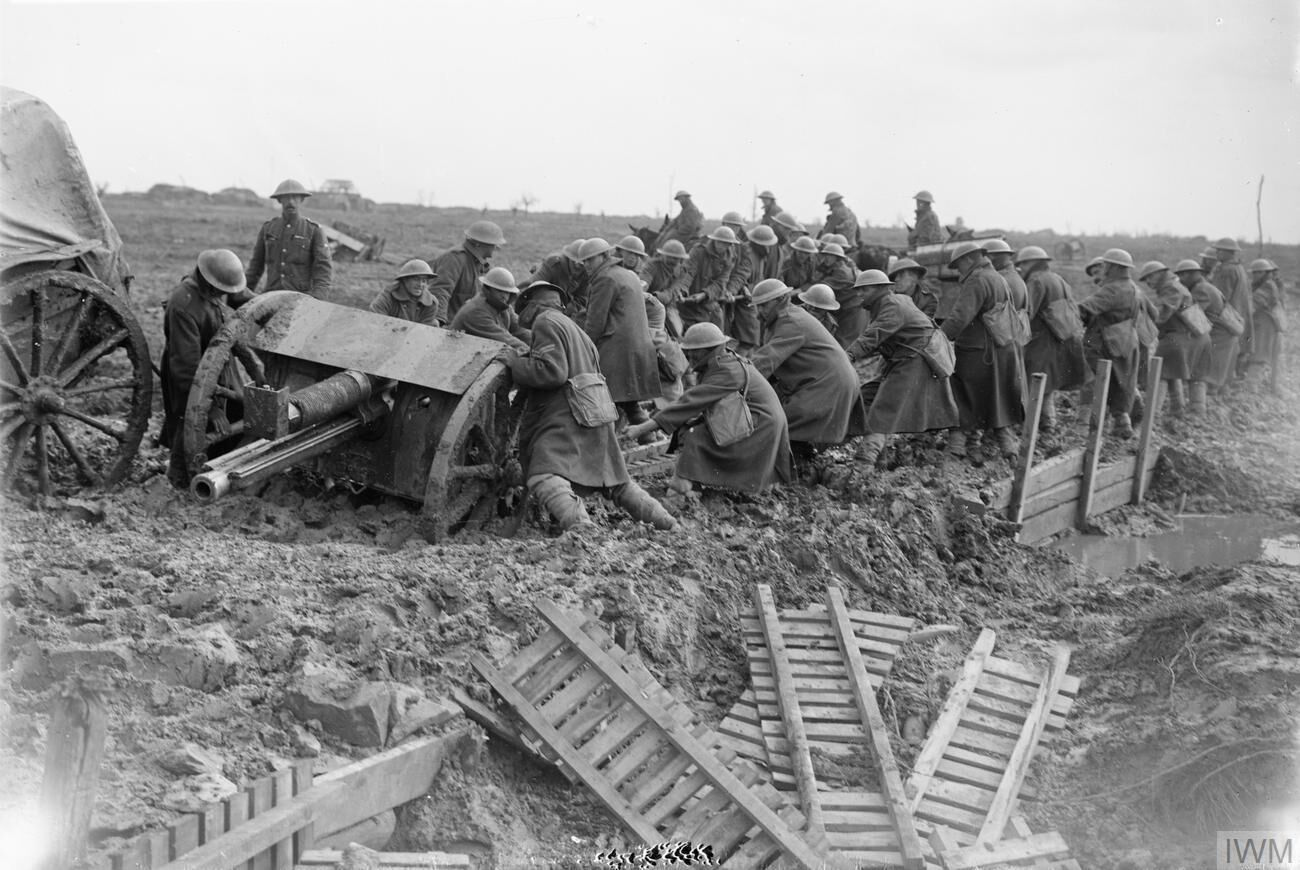
18-pounder being hauled out of mud at Langemarck, October 1917.

The division was back in action at the Battle of Broodseinde (4 October), with one infantry brigade attacking, but CCXLI Bde remained in reserve. Next day it was ordered forward, but the attempts to advance the guns were abandoned because of the mud and enemy shellfire. On 9 October the brigade fired in support of an attack by 66th (2nd East Lancashire) Division (the Battle of Poelcappelle), its Forward Observation Officers (FOOs) working their way forward with the infantry, though news was slow in coming back. Ground conditions were bad, and many batteries were bogged down, so the preparatory barrage was feeble, many of the HE shellbursts being deadened by the mud. Casualties among the gunners were also severe because they were exposed to German observers on the ridge. Another attempt to push the brigade's guns forward was abandoned. On 11 October the brigade managed to get 12 guns and four howitzers up to the Ypres–Roulers railway at Zonnebeke. However, it was relieved two days later.

==== Italy ====
On 10 November 1917 the 48th (SM) Division received orders to move to the Italian Front. By 1 December the units had finished detraining around Legnago on the Adige. On 1 March 1918 the division relieved 7th Division in the front line of the Montello sector on the Piave Front, and held the line until 16 March, through 48th (SM) DA remained in the line until 21/22 March, rejoining the division on 24 March. On 1 April the division moved westward into reserve for the middle sector of the Asiago Plateau Front.

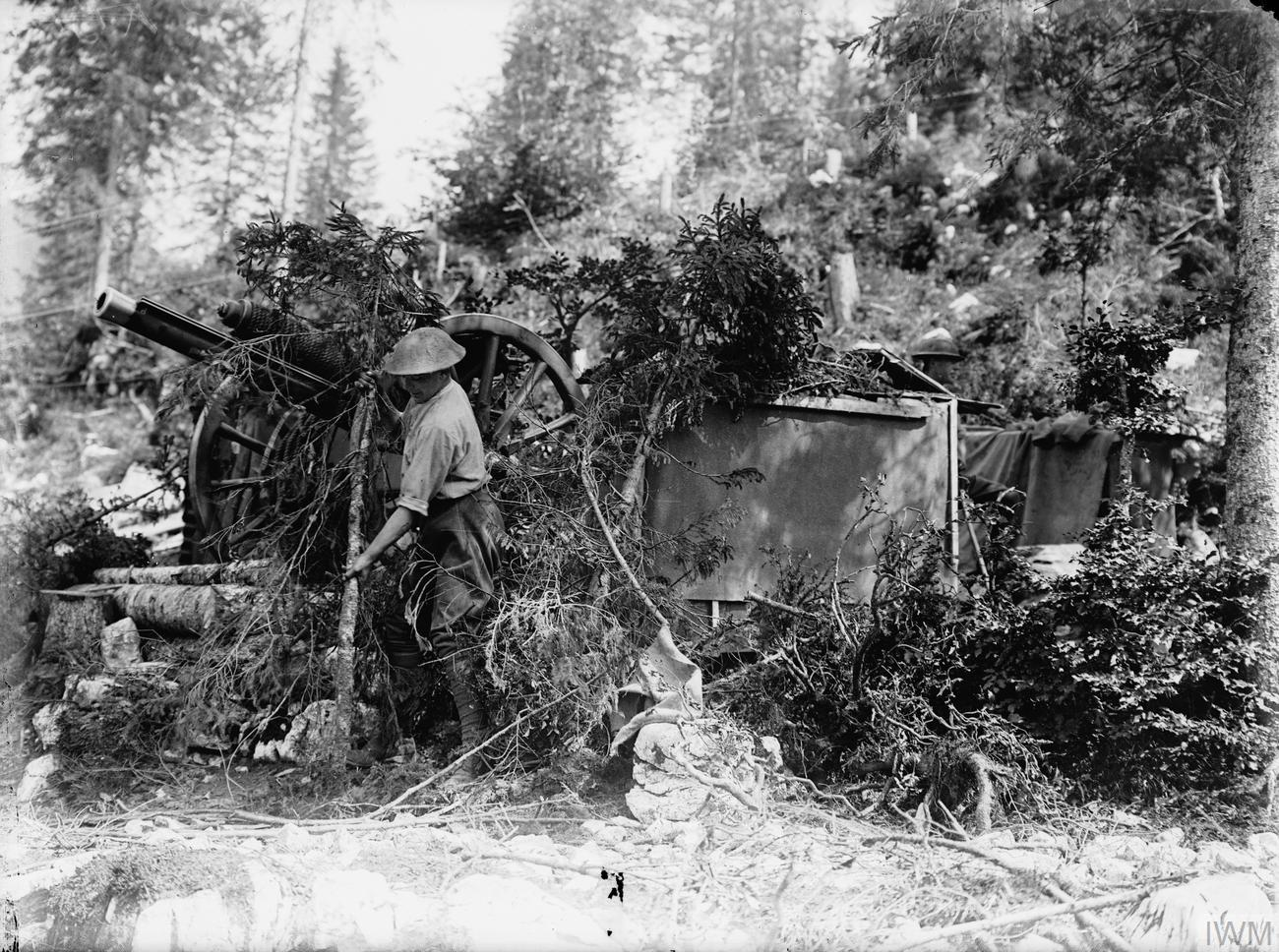
A camouflaged 18-pdr in Italy in 1918.

Later in April 48th (SM) Division began tours of duty on the Asiago plateau, where the guns were manhandled into positions on steep slopes and hidden among trees. The flat-trajectory 18-pdrs had to have lanes cut through the trees to allow them to fire. The division was holding the front line on 15 June when the Austro-Hungarian Army launched its last offensive (the Second Battle of the Piave River). The division was wakened by the effects of the Spanish flu epidemic, but the artillery began their counter-preparation barrage at 03.30 in response to the wild Austrian bombardment, and shortened the range at 05.00 after their own infantry outposts had withdrawn. Thick mist hampered the defensive fire all day and telephone lines were cut by fire, so the batteries had to rely on runners and cyclists for communications, and on their own initiative. CCXLI Brigade reported the use of gas shells by the enemy, and respirators had to be worn at all times. C Battery's observation post (OP) was manned by Lt R.A. Kirby and his signallers as the enemy bombardment started; all the signallers were wounded trying to repair the telephone line, so they resorted to flag signals, calling down fire on the 'SOS' target despite both OP and battery being under heavy gas shelling. As the mist cleared and the guns shifted to a better position, Lt Kirby was also wounded, but a wounded signaller kept contact until the line was repaired. By noon the battery only had three guns left in action. Because of the terrain there was little depth to the British positions, and Austrian infantry penetrating 48th (SM) Division's line got close to the guns, but they remained in action: A Bty engaged an infantry battalion at 15.15, driving it back leaving 2–300 dead and wounded. At the end of the day A Bty had lost a gun and much ammunition to a direct hit, but D Bty had fired over 4500 rounds from its six howitzers. 48th (SM) Division's infantry began counter-attacking that afternoon, and the following morning regained the lost ground. Although the Italian Army staff and press played down the part played by the British force, King Victor Emmanuel III later reviewed a composite battery drawn from CCXLI Bde.

48th (SM) Division remained in the Asiago sector throughout the summer and early autumn, carrying out a few minor operations. When the Allies forced the Piave line in later October (the Battle of Vittorio Veneto) the forces on the Asiago conformed when the Austrians withdrew. 48th (SM) Division began advancing into the Val d'Assa on 1 November, meeting some stiff resistance before the advance turned into a pursuit, with field gun sections accompanying the infantry brigade groups (there was not sufficient transport to support more than half the guns). On 3 November 1918, at Osteria del Termine, the division surrounded and captured a large force of Austrian troops including the corps commander and three divisional commanders. By 15.00 on 4 November, when the Armistice with Austria came into force, the division had pushed forward into the Trentino.

After the conclusion of hostilities 48th (SM) Division was withdrawn to Italy for the winter. Demobilisation began in 1919 and was complete by 31 March. A composite infantry brigade was kept in Italy a little longer, accompanied by a reformed CII Bde RFA, one battery of which was supplied by CCXLI Bde (made up from gunners who had joined from 1916 onwards, with a few volunteers).

=== 2/II South Midland Brigade ===
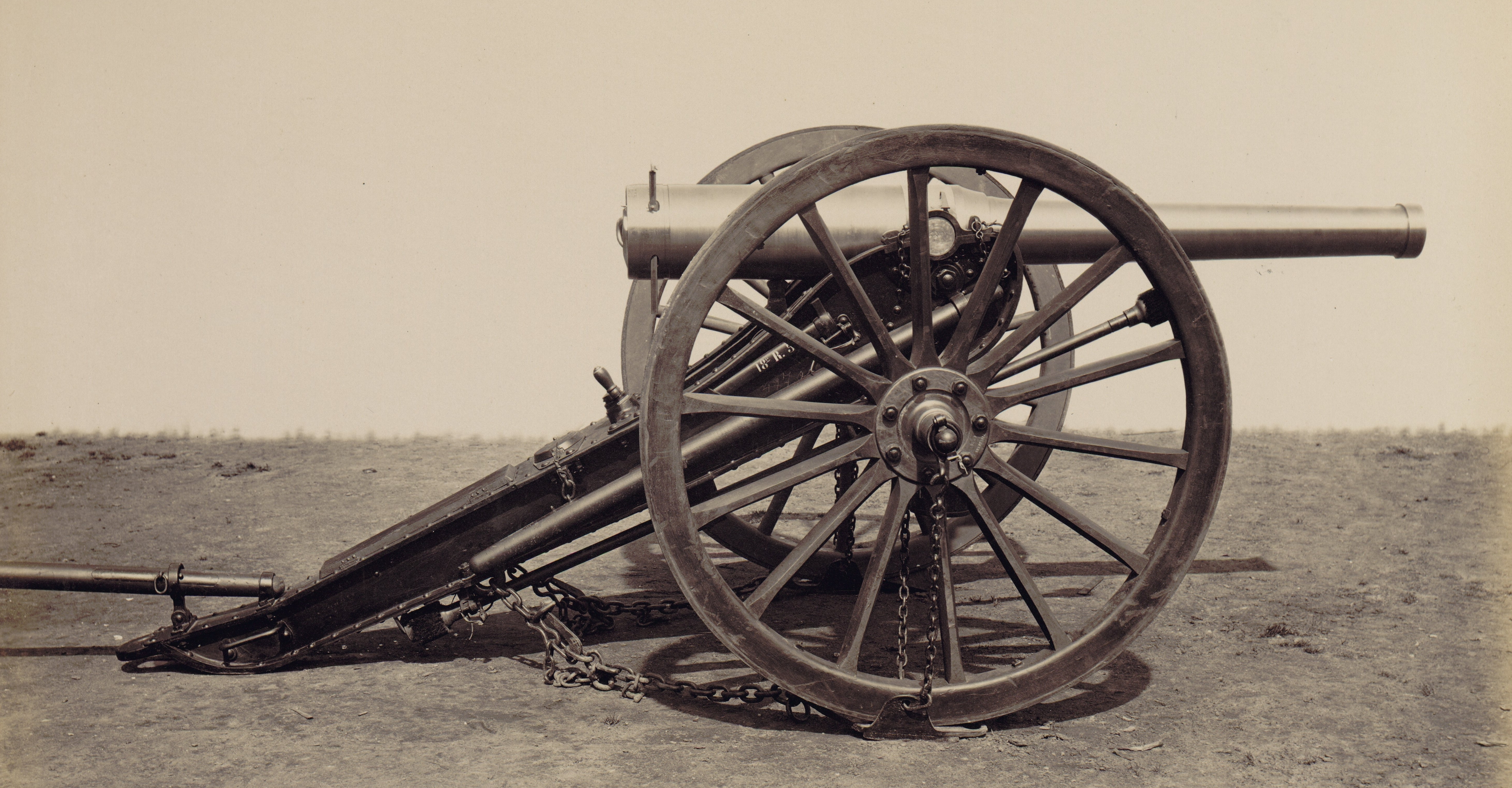
De Bange 90 mm French field gun issued to 2nd Line batteries.

The 2nd Line brigade was formed in the autumn of 1914, and in January 1915 it joined the 2nd South Midland Division (later 61st (2nd South Midland) Division) at Northampton. It was commanded by Colonel Ralph Lyon, former CO of 1st Worcester RGA (V) who had been recalled from the TF Reserve. While stationed at Northampton, the division formed part of First Army of Central Force, but once the 48th Division had gone to France, the 61st replaced it around Chelmsford as part of Third Army, Central Force, responsible for coastal defence. By the summer of 1915 2/II South Midland Bde was stationed at Northampton and at camps across Essex, at Ingatestone, Epping and Writtle (Brigade HQ), with gun drill carried out at Hylands Park. Equipment was scarce, and until the end of 1915 the only guns available for training were obsolete French De Bange 90 mm guns. The divisional artillery carried out field training around Hatfield Peverel and Woodham Walter. In September 1915 2/II South Midland Bde exchanged camps with 2/IV SM (H) Bde at Great Baddow. In January 1916 the brigade received four of the obsolescent 15-pounders that had equipped 1st Line TF units and in February the division moved to Salisbury Plain for final battle training. Only when the division prepared to go overseas were modern 18-pounders issued. In May it concentrated in the Tidworth–Bulford area, and on 16/17 May 1916 2/II (SM) brigade was redesignated CCCVI Brigade RFA (306 Bde) and the batteries became A, B and C. It was joined by 2/4th Warwickshire (Howitzer) Bty from 2/IV South Midland Brigade (now CCCCVIII Bde), which became D (H) Bty, equipped with 4.5-inch howitzers.

==== Fromelles ====
CCCVI Brigade under the command of Lt-Col F.G. Willock left Bulford on 23 May and entrained at Amesbury for Southampton Docks, where it boarded the SS Hunscraft, except C Bty aboard the transport Black Prince. The Hunscraft returned to Southampton after an alert, and it was not until 25 May that the brigade landed at Le Havre. It then went by train to Merville, being billeted near Haverskerque on 27 May, though many of the men camped in the fields. 61st (2nd SM) Division completed its concentration next day. The artillery continued training, and sent parties up to 38th (Welsh) Division in the line for introduction to front line duties. On 13 June CCCVI Bde moved into the line at Laventie, relieving Right Group of 38th (W) Divisional Artillery.

The bombardment for that summer's 'Big Push' (the Battle of the Somme) began on 24 June, and 61st (2nd SM) DA joined in, with CCCVI Bde engaged in wire-cutting and bombardment of 'soft spots', as well as supporting trench raids. The division's first action was the Attack at Fromelles on 19 July 1916, a diversionary operation in support of the Somme Offensive. 61st (2nd SM) DA was relieved by 31st Division's artillery on 14/15 July and moved to new positions with CCCVI Bde in the Centre Group. Artillery preparation began on 18 July but failed to suppress the enemy artillery. The infantry attack was a disaster, the assaulting battalions taking very heavy casualties. CCCVI Brigade's OP was destroyed by shellfire. 61st (2nd SM) Division was so badly mauled that it was not used offensively again in 1916.

On 16/17 September CCCV (2/I SM) Brigade was broken up among the other brigades of 61st (2nd SM) DA to bring them up to 6-gun batteries, giving CCCVI Bde the following organisation:

- A Bty (2/1st Worcestershire Bty + half 2/1st Gloucestershire Bty) – 6 x 18-pdrs
- B Bty (2/2nd Worcestershire Bty + half 2/1st Gloucestershire Bty) – 6 x 18-pdrs
- C Bty (2/3rd Worcestershire Bty + half 2/2nd Gloucestershire Bty) – 6 x 18-pdrs
- D (H) Bty (2/4th Warwickshire Bty) – 4 x 4.5-inch

==== 1916–17 ====
61st (2nd SM) Division stayed in the line until it was relieved by 56th (1/1st London) Division on 28 October, but its artillery remained in position until 15 November, when CCCVI Bde began pulling out by sections before marching to the Somme area on 21 November. By 26 November it had reached Bouzincourt and began emplacing and registering its guns. In January 1917 61st (2nd SM) DA was reinforced by 18th (Eastern) Division's artillery, LXXXIII Bde joining CCCVI Bde to support Fifth Army's operations on the Ancre from 11 to 15 January. Afterwards the brigade withdrew to a rest and training area at Hiermont where on 27 January D (H) Bty was made up to six howitzers when it was joined by Right Section of D (H)/CCCVIII Bty.

On 16–17 February the brigade returned to the line at Guillaucourt in the Somme sector. It pulled out its guns on 18 March to follow the German retreat to the Hindenburg Line, harassing them as they went, and then supporting operations against the outposts from 5 April. Together with a battery from CLVII Bde it supported 183rd (2nd Gloucester and Worcester) Infantry Bde against Fresnoy-le-Petit and then IV Corps' attacks on 'Gricourt Trench' and 'Cologne Park' near Pontruet. By 2 May brigade HQ was established at Holnon Wood, and on 9 May moved to Étreillers. On 19 May the brigade was withdrawn to rest, returning to the line in the Arras sector on 8 June, first at Wancourt, later at Habarcq, supporting minor operations and raids.

In July 1917 61st (2nd SM) Division was withdrawn from Third Army and moved to the Ypres sector, where it went into reserve for the Third Ypres Offensive. Like 48th (SM) Division it was not committed until the second phase of the offensive, the Battle of Langemarck, and then only late in the battle (22 August), when 184th (2nd South Midland) Bde gained a few hundred yards of ground against camouflaged concrete pillboxes that were invisible to the artillery observers. On 27 August and 10 September the division was again halted by the strongpoints hidden in the farm buildings.

==== Cambrai ====
By October, 61st (2nd SM) Division was back with Third Army in a quiet sector, with CCCVI Bde supporting trench raids and using its howitzers for gas bombardments of the enemy trenches. Then on 8 November the CO and battery commanders were summoned to Léchelle to reconnoitre new gun positions. For Third Army's forthcoming attack (the Battle of Cambrai) the brigade was detached from 61st (2nd SM) Division to 51st (Highland) Division. The batteries exchanged their unreliable guns with selected ones from CCCVII Bde and moved on 16 November to Metz-en-Couture, where they constructed new gun positions. On the night of 19 November the guns were moved in and brigade HQ was established in Havrincourt Wood. The attack opened at 06.20 on 20 November with a surprise bombardment and a mass tank advance. At first 51st (H) Division's attack went well, crossing the Hindenburg Line, and by 11.00 CCCVI Bde's guns were moving forward to new positions in the former No Man's land near Trescault to support the Highlanders' advance on the Flesquières Ridge. However, German guns hidden on the reverse slope destroyed most of the tanks as they crossed the ridge and held up the infantry, who got no requests back for artillery support. 51st (H) Division failed to enter Flesquières until the Germans withdrew at nightfall. Next morning Willock reconnoitred new positions for his guns at Orival Wood near the village and brigade HQ moved up from Havrincourt wood at 16.00. All day on 22 November the batteries were in action against enemy counter-attacks, and over the following days the brigade supported 51st (H) and later Guards Division's attacks on Fontaine and Bourlon. The British offensive became bogged down and the Germans launched a counter-offensive on 30 November. During the night Flesquières came under heavy shellfire and A, B and C Btys had to withdraw from Orival Wood (D (H) Bty was some 400 yards (370 m) to the south-west). Brigade HQ was set up in a captured dugout in the Hindenburg Line. Next day 61st (2nd SM) Division arrived to relieve exhausted British troops. As the German offensive continued, CCCVI Bde withdrew to positions in the Grand Ravine between Ribécourt and Havrincourt on the night of 4/5 December. By 7 December the German advance had been held, and two days later CCCVI Bde moved from the Grand Ravine back to Havrincourt Wood, commanding Right Group of 36th (Ulster) DA. On 14 December the brigade reverted to the command of 61st (2nd SM) Division. Its batteries were relieved between 20 and 25 December and moved back to Caix.

==== Spring Offensive ====
On 13 December CCCVI Bde returned to the line between Savy and Holnon, with the three 18-pdr batteries of CCCXV Army Field Bde also under command, constituting Right Group of 61st (2nd SM) DA, under Col Willock. The BEF was now in defensive mode, and the batteries spent the winter months reconnoitring and preparing alternative and 'silent' positions. On 20–21 January 1918 the brigade handed over control of Right Group to CCCXV Bde and went for a week's intensive training. On return to the line it took over positions in the Battle Zone, with brigade HQ at Attilly. When the German spring offensive opened on 21 March, 61st (2nd SM) Division was mostly disposed on the reverse slopes of a spur running north from St Quentin. The attack began with a massive bombardment at 04.40, and the advance of the German infantry was covered by mist. The outposts were soon overrun, and all but one section of CCCVII Bde was captured, but the line of redoubts at the back of the Forward Zone held out for a long time and once the mist cleared the fire from 61st (SM) Division's Battle Zone positions held back the Germans with CCCVI's batteries firing in support of 184th Bde. Counter-attacks during the afternoon relieved the pressure. Next day the Germans put in another heavy attack on the Holnon Plateau. In the morning CCCVI Bde's HQ dugout collapsed under shellfire and the staff relocated to the HQ of 182nd (2nd Warwickshire) Bde, before moving back to Beauvois at noon. Although 61st (SM) Division was holding its own, flanking formations were in retreat, and the division had to retire. The guns and ammunition were got away and CCCVI Bde came into action again at Fern Copse at 17.00 before withdrawing to the Somme at 20.30. The division went into reserve early on 23 March, but CCCVI Bde's guns remained in continuous action defending the bridgehead at Béthencourt.

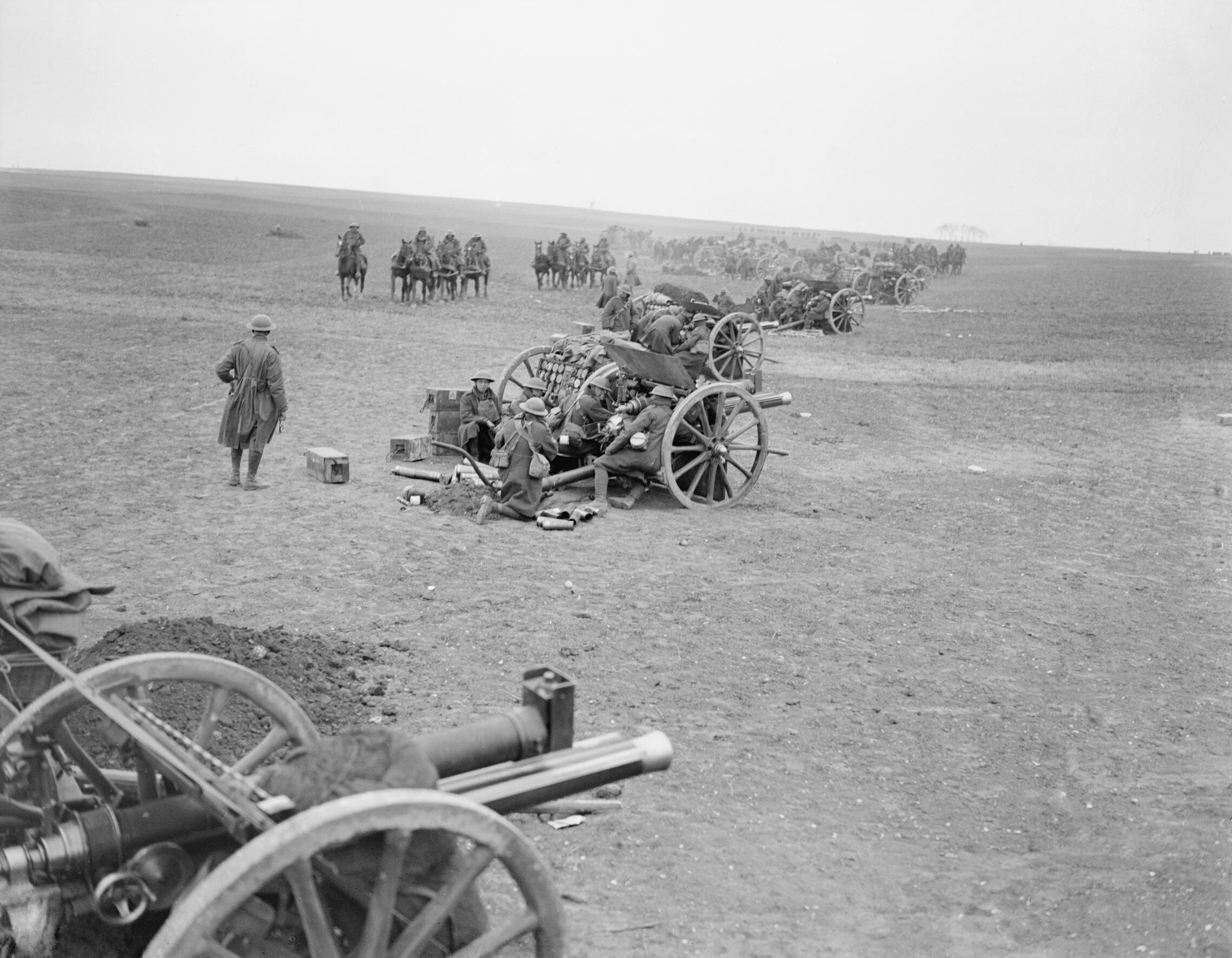
A battery of 18-pdrs in action in the open during the German Spring Offensive.

On 24 March the Germans crossed the Somme and a retirement was ordered behind the Canal du Nord, where 184th Bde was already digging in. 183rd Brigade was ordered up from reserve to make a counter-attack at noon, which CCVI Bde supported, but at 13.15 the batteries had to evacuate the positions at Mesnil and retire to Herly, moving back to Billancourt at 21.00. By now the British troops in this sector had come under French command. During 25 March 61st (2nd SM) DA fired to cover the French withdrawal, and was almost cut off and captured at Gruny at the end of the day, A, B and D Btys of CCCVI Bde pulling out at 20.30, C Bty not until 22.00. The brigade arrived at Villers-lès-Roye during the night. It continued to fall back during 26 and 27 March, between halting to cover the French, and was in position in front of Le Plessier by nightfall. The Germans made a heavy attack on the morning of 28 March (the Third Battle of Arras) and at 15.00 the batteries were withdrawn 2,000 yards (1,800 m). The enemy still coming on, the brigade was withdrawn across the River Avre. Allied counter-attacks began on 29 March, and at 09.00 CCCVI Bde recrossed the Avre, coming into action near the outskirts of Moreuil, but was forced to withdraw across the river once more that evening. The batteries continued in action between Rouvrel and Morisel throughout 30 March–3 April. On 4 April the Germans put in a fresh attack (the Battle of the Avre), but their advance on Rouvrel was frustrated by the barrage put down by CCCVI Bde before it withdrew. By the end of the day the batteries were deployed south of Cottenchy with brigade HQ at La Houche Farm. Next day it supported a French counter-attack between Rouvrel and Moreuil, which marked the end of the German offensive on this front. The brigade carried out intermittent fire on German positions until 19.30 on 6 April, when it was pulled out and marched 42 miles (68 km) north to rejoin the British forces in front of Villers-Bretonneux.

61st (2nd SM) Division's exhausted infantry had been relieved and sent north (where they were engaged in the Battle of the Lys from 11 to 18 April), but the divisional artillery remained in position at Villers-Bretonneux, supporting British, Australian and French units. CCCVI Brigade was relieved on 22–23 April and sent north to First Army. By the end of the month the batteries were reorganising and re-equipping at Quernes, some miles from Béthune. From 4 May the brigade began moving by sections into the line north of Gonnehem, coming under 4th Divisional Artillery. The guns were registered and were involved in gas attacks by both sides. On 21 May brigade HQ exchanged with 256th Brigade, Royal Field Artillery and took over Right Group of 16th (Irish) Divisional Artillery (later 6th Divisional Artillery), with CCCVII and 12th Australian Field Artillery (later CCLXXXII) brigades under command. By late June the reorganised 61st (2nd SM) Division had re-entered the line in front of its own artillery, and Right Group supported it in the usual trench raids. It also made a demonstration and smokescreen on 28 June to assist 5th Division's surprise attack on La Becque (Operation Borderland).

==== Hundred Days Offensive ====
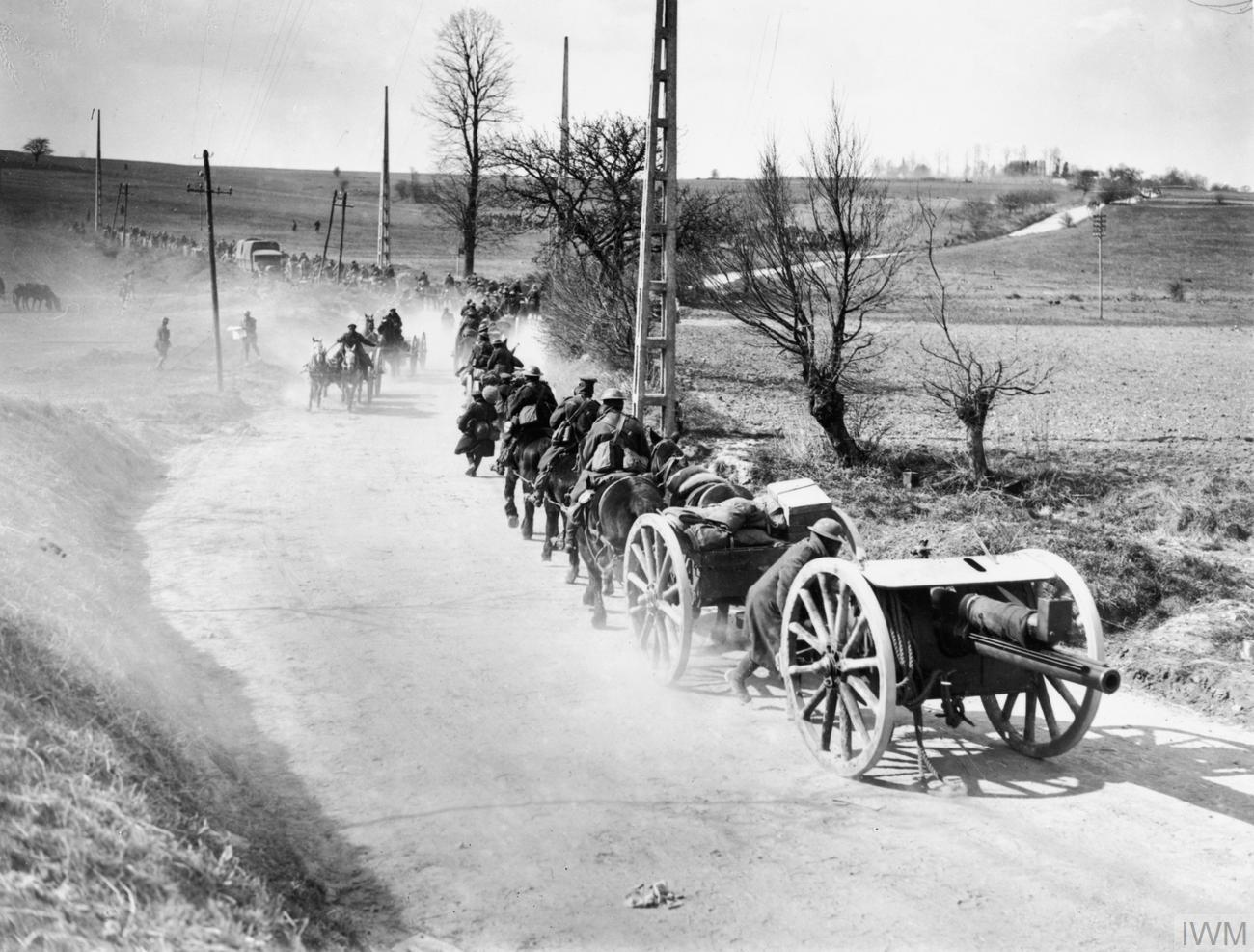
18-pounder battery moving up, 1918.

CCCVI Brigade was pulled out of the line for training from 13 July, and then went onto GHQ Reserve. On 25 July Lt-Col E.W.S. Brooks took over the brigade from Lt-Col Willock, who had commanded it since it landed in France. At the end of July advance parties began constructing new gun positions at Enquin-les-Mines, which were occupied on 1 August. However, after a week the batteries handed over these positions and moved to Saint-Floris. The Allied Hundred Days Offensive was now under way, and by 18 August Fifth Army's infantry was edging forward as the enemy gave up ground, with CCCVI Bde following up in support. On 30 August the brigade became 'Advanced Guard Artillery' supporting 184th Bde, with C Bty and two sections of D (H) Bty leading. As the cautious advance continued CCCVI Bde handed over the advanced guard role to CCCVII Bde on 4 September, resuming it on 16 September. From 23 September the guns fired for 184th Bde's operation against the strongpoints of 'Bartlett Farm' and 'Junction Post', which was carried out from 30 September to 2 October and the advance resumed.

61st (2nd SM) Division was transferred to Third Army on 5 October and CCCVI Bde entrained for Doullens. It then resumed its role with the Advanced Guard of the division (with 183rd Bde). It came into the line on 13 October during Third Army's pursuit to the River Selle and three days later supported an operation against Haussy by 24th Division. Third Army now launched a fullscale assault against the German positions (the Battle of the Selle). CCCVI Brigade moved forward during the night of 18/19 October to support 19th (Western) Division's continued attack on Haussy on 20 October, then crossed the river itself and set up HQ in the town. Lieutenant-Col Brook took over Right Group of artillery comprising LXXXVII and CCCXV Bdes as well as 61st (SM) DA. The group supported a raid on the night of 21/22 October that captured Ferme de Rieux, then 19th (W) Division's advance through Les Forrieres to the high ground beyond on 23 October. Brook then handed Right Group over to 19th DA and moved C and D (H) Btys forward during the night as 61st (2nd SM) Division prepared to attack. For its first setpiece attack in over a year, the division was supported by nine RFA brigades, including its own and 19th (W) Division's. The 18-pdrs laid down a creeping barrage, then 90 minutes after Zero CCCVI Bde left Right Group and advanced by batteries to support the advance of 183rd Bde across the river (where a special field artillery bridge was built by the engineers). 182nd Brigade alongside got held up by uncut wire, but 184th Bde passed through 183rd later in the day with a special barrage and completed the division's objectives for the day. On 26 October the batteries moved up again and next day supported 61st (2nd SM) Divisio's attempts to establish bridgeheads across the River Rhonelle. Brook took over the same Right Group brigades once more on 31 October and moved his HQ up to the north end of Bermerain. The Rhonelle was crossed on 1–2 November (the Battle of Valenciennes), with 182nd Bde behind a creeping barrage making for the high ground and the village of Maresches. The attack was disrupted by an enemy counter-attack, and a repeat attack that evening with a fresh barrage was also held up; 184th Bde succeeded in gaining the bridgeheads next morning. The advance was now turning into a pursuit, and CCCVI Bde moved forward almost daily; planned barrages were sometime cancelled when it was found that the opposing Germans had already retreated. On 4 November it supported an attack by 24th Division, but otherwise there was little firing, When hostilities were ended by the Armistice on 11 November the brigade was in readiness at Feignies.

After the Armistice CCCVI Bde marched back into France, and on 7–8 December went into winter quarters around Beauvoir-Wavans. Demobilisation began in January 1919 and by 1 June the brigade had been reduced to a cadre.

== Interwar ==
When the TF was reconstituted on 7 February 1920, II South Midland Bde reformed at Worcester with 1st–4th Worcestershire Btys. In 1921 the TF was reorganised as the Territorial Army (TA) and the unit was redesignated as 67th (South Midland) Brigade, RFA, with the following organisation:

- Brigade HQ at 24 Southfield Street, Worcester
- 265th (Worcester) Bty at 24 Southfield Street
- 266th (Worcester) Bty at Clarence Road, Malvern
- 267th (Worcester) Bty at Easemore, Redditch
- 268th (Worcester) Bty (Howitzers) at Trinity Road, Dudley

The brigade was once again part of 48th (SM) Division, which had also reformed in 1920. In 1924 the RFA was subsumed into the Royal Artillery (RA), and the word 'Field' was inserted into the titles of its brigades and batteries. The establishment of a TA divisional artillery brigade was four 6-gun batteries, three equipped with 18-pounders and one with 4.5-inch howitzers, all of World War I patterns. However, the batteries only held four guns in peacetime. The guns and their first-line ammunition wagons were still horsedrawn and the battery staffs were mounted. Partial mechanisation was carried out from 1927, but the guns retained iron-tyred wheels until pneumatic tyres began to be introduced just before World War II. In 1938 the RA modernised its nomenclature and a lieutenant-colonel's command was designated a 'regiment' rather than a 'brigade'; this applied to TA field brigades from 1 November 1938.

== World War II ==
=== Mobilisation ===
The TA was doubled in size after the Munich Crisis, and most regiments formed duplicates. Part of the reorganisation was that field regiments changed from four six-gun batteries to an establishment of two batteries, each of three four-gun troops. For the Worcester artillery this resulted in the following organisation from 25 May 1939:

67th (South Midland) Field Regiment

- Regimental Headquarters (RHQ) at Worcester
- 265 (Worcester) Field Bty
- 266 (Worcester) Field Bty

119th Field Regiment

- RHQ at Dudley
- 267 (Worcester) Field Bty
- 268 (Worcester) Field Bty

The TA mobilised on 1 September 1939, just before the outbreak of war, with 67th (SM) Fd Rgt in 48th (SM) Division and 119th Fd Rgt in the newly formed 61st Infantry Division.

=== 67th (South Midland) Field Regiment ===
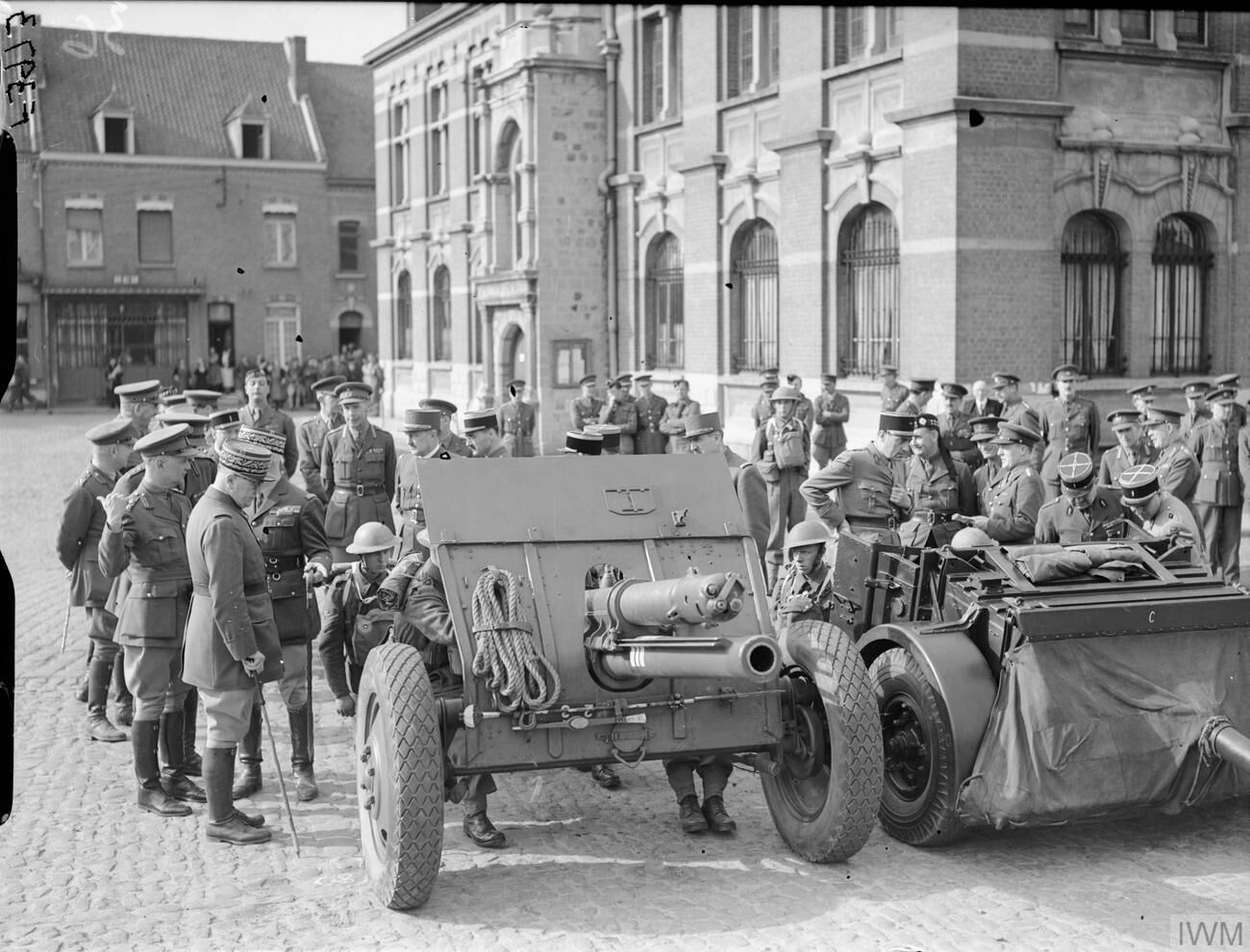
Modernised 18-pdr being inspected in France, April 1940.

==== Battle of France ====
Under the command of Lt-Col A.C.W. Hobson the regiment went to Ramsbury in Wiltshire for intensive training. Then on 15 January 1940 it was sent to France with 48th (SM) Division to join the British Expeditionary Force (BEF). However, the BEF's policy was to spread training by exchanging some TA units with Regulars: on 31 January 67th (SM) Fd Rgt was exchanged with one from 1st Infantry Division; it remained with this formation for the rest of the war. The regiment still had 18-pdrs and 4.5-inch howitzers. It came into position at Évin-Malmaison and Courcelles, east of Lens, before moving on 2 February to new positions at La Coquerie. Later it moved again to La Croix, east of Templeuve, where it remained until the Phoney War ended.

When the German offensive began with the invasion of the Low Countries on 10 May, the BEF advanced into Belgium under Plan D, and soon its leading divisions were in place on the River Dyle, with 1st Division holding the front line under I Corps. 67th (SM) Field Rgt reached Brussels Racecourse on 12 May and that night moved its guns and OPs into position near Leefdaal, with 5/22 Bty of 1st Medium Rgt under command. Leefdaal was bombed on the night of 14/15 May, but the regiment suffered no casualties and everything remained quiet on its front. But the Germans had broken through in the Ardennes and the BEF was forced to retreat. 67th (SM) Field Rgt received orders at 17.00 on 17 May to withdraw immediately to new positions around Auderghem. One troop of each battery was to stay behind until 22.30: E Trp got away, but C Trp of 265 Bty was badly shelled just as they were to move. One gun at a time was withdrawn during intervals in the shelling and the troop finally got away without casualties after the infantry had left. The regiment left Auderghem at 09.00 on 18 May and came into action by 14.00 at Zobbroek, where it was bombed by Junkers Ju 87 Stukas without casualties. That night the whole division drove back to a concentration area at Aspelare using a single road, with exhausted drivers falling asleep.

On 18 May the regiment was in action at Voorde. It pulled out again that night, this time with D Trp as the rearguard: the troop fired 110 rounds before just escaping at dawn. The regiment then moved via Tournai to Bailleul through awful traffic congestion, refugees and bombing. Good gun positions were hard to find because the whole area was overlooked by Mont-Saint-Aubert north of Tournai. By now the BEF was holding the line of the Escaut. However, by 22 May the Germans had broken through to the English Channel and the BEF was cut off. 1st Division fell back from the Escaut to hold the line of the Belgian Frontier as the BEF shortened its front. On 26 May the decision was made to evacuate the BEF through Dunkirk (Operation Dynamo). There was heavy fighting on the frontier as the BEF fought to keep the 'pocket' open and allow the evacuation to proceed. By 28 May I Corps was defending the central part of the Dunkirk bridgehead and preparing to act as the rearguard.

On 1 June, 1st Division thinned out its line and began evacuating its troops: 67th (SM) Fd Rgt was still in action, albeit with many of its less essential men having already embarked, and having destroyed much of its equipment. Finally, the artillery were ordered to destroy their guns and leave if they could. Evacuation ended at dawn on 2 June, after as many men as possible had been taken off.

==== Home defence ====
67th (SM) Field Rgt began re-assembling at Leeds on 4 June, establishing RHQ at The Cornerhouse in Moortown. By 9 June, as men trickled back from the disembarkation ports in southern England, the regiment had 25 officers and 276 other ranks from an establishment of 580 all ranks. I Corps was concentrating in Lincolnshire and by 21 June the regiment was at Sleaford. Until the guns lost in France could be replaced, it was to operate as infantry in an anti-paratroop role. Slowly the field artillery were re-equipped, first with extemporised guns, later with the modern Mk II 25-pounder towed by Quad tractors.

One of the lessons learned from the Battle of France was that the two-battery organisation did not work: field regiments were intended to support an infantry brigade of three battalions. As a result, they were reorganised into three 8-gun batteries, but it was not until late 1940 that the RA had enough trained battery staffs to carry out the reorganisation. 67th (SM) Field Rgt accordingly formed R Bty at Heckington on 1 January 1941, which was numbered 446 Fd Bty by 26 March. 1st Division remained training in Lincolnshire until late 1941 when it transferred to II Corps in Norfolk.

==== Tunisia ====
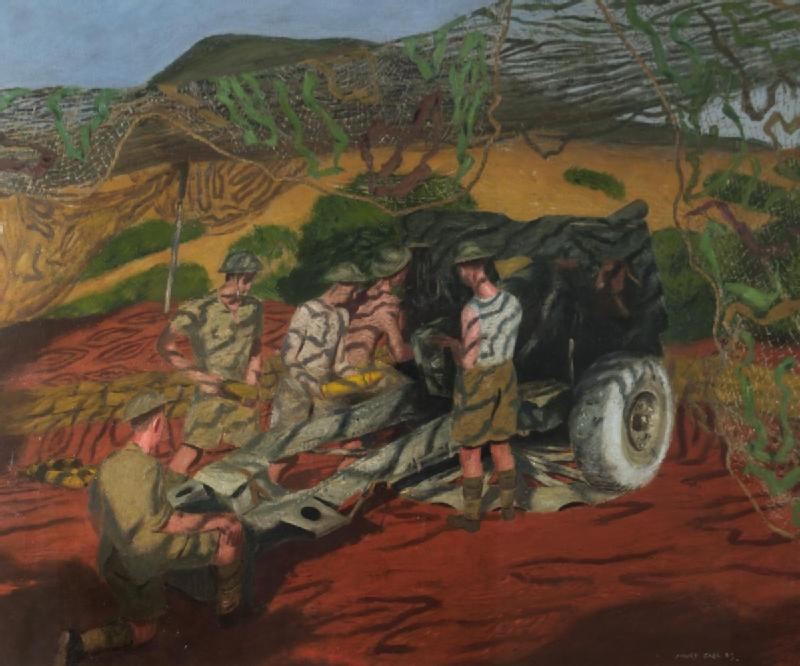
Painting by Henry Carr of a camouflaged 25-pdr in action near Medjez el Bab.

On 26 October 1942 1st Division was assigned to 'Force 125' which was the codename for I Corps as it prepared for the Allied invasion of North Africa (Operation Torch). The landings began on 8 November, but as a follow-up formation 1st Division did not sail until 28 February 1943, landing on 9 March. It reached the forward area between 14 and 18 March and was assigned to V Corps of First Army for the final offensive of the Tunisian campaign (Operation Vulcan). To disrupt this, the Germans put in a spoiling attack early on 21 April, hitting 1st Division's positions on 'Banana Ridge'. Despite some threat to the artillery, which was assembled close to the front for the forthcoming offensive, the attack was beaten off, and V Corps launched its own attack on 23 April. 1st Division in the Medjz Valley had as its objectives a ridge of low hills between Grich el Oued and Gueriat el Atach. 2nd Brigade attacked with the support of five field regiments as well as medium and heavy batteries. It easily reached Gueriat el Atach, but was pressed backwards during the day by German counter-attacks. On the following afternoon 3rd Brigade captured the whole ridge, and held it despite being plagued by enemy guns and mortars. The division had further sharp actions on 26–29 April. There was a shortage of 25-pdr ammunition in the theatre and the field regiments sometimes had to be rationed.

First Army was now in position for the final assault on Tunis (Operation Strike). V Corps attacked on the evening of 5 May, when 3rd Bde supported by more than 600 guns captured Djebel Bou Aoukaz. Next day IX Corps made an armoured thrust towards the city, which fell on 7 May. The remaining Axis forces in Tunisia surrendered on 13 May.

==== Italy ====
On 11 June 1st Division carried out an assault landing on the Italian fortress island of Pantelleria (Operation Corkscrew). It had been so thoroughly bombarded from the air and sea over the preceding month that there was little opposition and white flags appeared as soon as the infantry of 3rd Bde landed. The division was back in North Africa by 15 June. It was not employed in the subsequent Allied invasion of Sicily (Operation Husky) or the early stages of the Italian Campaign. It finally sailed for Italy on 5 December 1943, landing on 7 December, and was assigned to Fifth US Army.

The advance of the Allied Armies in Italy (AAI) had been held up in front of the Germans' Winter Line, and in January 1944 an amphibious assault on Anzio was launched to outflank this line. The newly arrived 1st Division was selected to be one of the formations employed. The landings on 22 January, launching the Battle of Anzio, took the Germans completely by surprise. 1st Division's landing on 'Peter' Beach was completely undisturbed and 2nd Bde was ashore by 02.45. 67th (SM) Field Rgt had its guns ready for action by 08.30, but there were no targets. Yet the successful landing was not followed up, and the Germans reacted quickly, sealing off the bridgehead within days. When 1st Division began its advance inland on 28 January, it ran into serious opposition. Its fullscale attack towards Campoleone on 30–31 January failed to break through and only created an awkward salient. Bitter fighting, mostly at night, went on throughout early February as the Germans tried to eliminate the Campoleone salient and recapture the town of Aprilia. 1st Division abandoned the salient and held a shortened line. The divisional artillery gave the Germans no rest and revived World War I practices such as counter-preparation fire, where the guns 'worked over' likely German concentration and assembly points and routes. At the heart of the February battles the divisional artillery was firing 160 tons of shells a day. With no vantage points for OPs in the flat terrain, the guns had to rely on the air observation post (AOP) aircraft of No. 655 Squadron RAF, flown by RA officers. By 11 February 1st Division was too weak to carry out an urgent counter-attack on Aprilia and was reinforced by US troops; the attack failed but a German attack on 16–17 February was broken by artillery fire. The Anzio front then settled down to trench warfare with harassing artillery fire by both sides.

The stalemate at Anzio was broken in May 1944 when the Allies broke through the Winter Line and the troops in the beachhead were tasked with breaking out to cut the German line of retreat. 1st Division, with its infantry units badly understrength, only played a minor part in these operations, which began on 22 May. The combined Allied force then advanced on Rome, though 1st Division was held up by German rearguards and did not reach the River Tiber until 5 June, after the city had fallen.

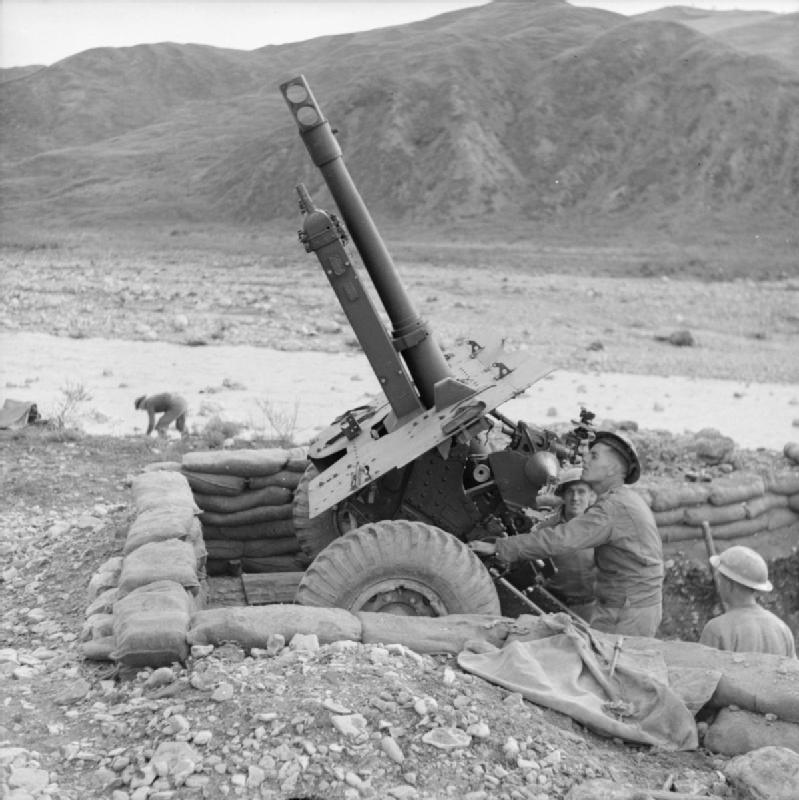
A 25-pdr of 266 Bty, 67th (SM) Fd Rgt, being used for high angle fire near San Clemente, 2 December 1944.

After the fall of Rome, 1st Division went into reserve. It came back into the line during the capture of Florence, gaining a foothold on the north bank of the River Arno on 12 August. It expanded this bridgehead on 21 August as the Allies prepared to assault the Gothic Line (Operation Olive). During this operation the division occupied the line of hills from Monte Giovi to Monte Morello on the night of 7/8 September to screen the advance of II US Corps. It then was shifted eastward to take over flank protection for XIII British Corps. On 9 September it advanced up the road from Borgo San Lorenzo to the Casaglia Pass. En route it provided artillery support for the neighbouring 85th US Division, firing 4–500 rounds per gun on 12 and 13 September, the re-supply of which caused severe transport problems. By 15 September 1st Battalion Hertfordshire Regiment of 1st Division, supported by 116 guns, secured the heights commanding the western approaches to the pass, but failed to clear the east side. However, 8th Indian Division captured the dominating Monte Femmina Morte on 16 September, easing 1st Division's advance through the pass. The division took Palazzuolo in the valley of the River Senio, but was then confronted by strong defensive positions based on Monte Gameraldi: 2nd Bde made five unsuccessful attempts to secure the summit on 25–26 September. However, a flanking move by 66th Bde caused the defenders to abandon the mountain. Further advances were slowed by the need to get the Palazzuolo road able to support the transport. The division's gunners were also experiencing particular problems in finding positions to fire over crests to hit targets behind.

By mid-October the offensive in the Apennine Mountains had begun to lose impetus as the Allied supply lines were stretched – artillery ammunition had to be rationed – and the difficulty of finding suitable gun positions increased. 1st Division was exhausted and could not continue to attack in the winter conditions, any advance depending on German withdrawals. The offensive was closed down on 26 October. AAI had instituted a policy of rotating exhausted British formations from Italy to the Middle East for rest and reorganisation. 1st Division's turn came up at the beginning of 1945 and the division sailed on 28 January, arriving in Palestine on 2 February. It remained there until after the end of the war.

67th (South Midland) Field Rgt entered suspended animation on 28 January 1946.

=== 119th (South Midland) Field Regiment ===
Formation sign of 61st Division.

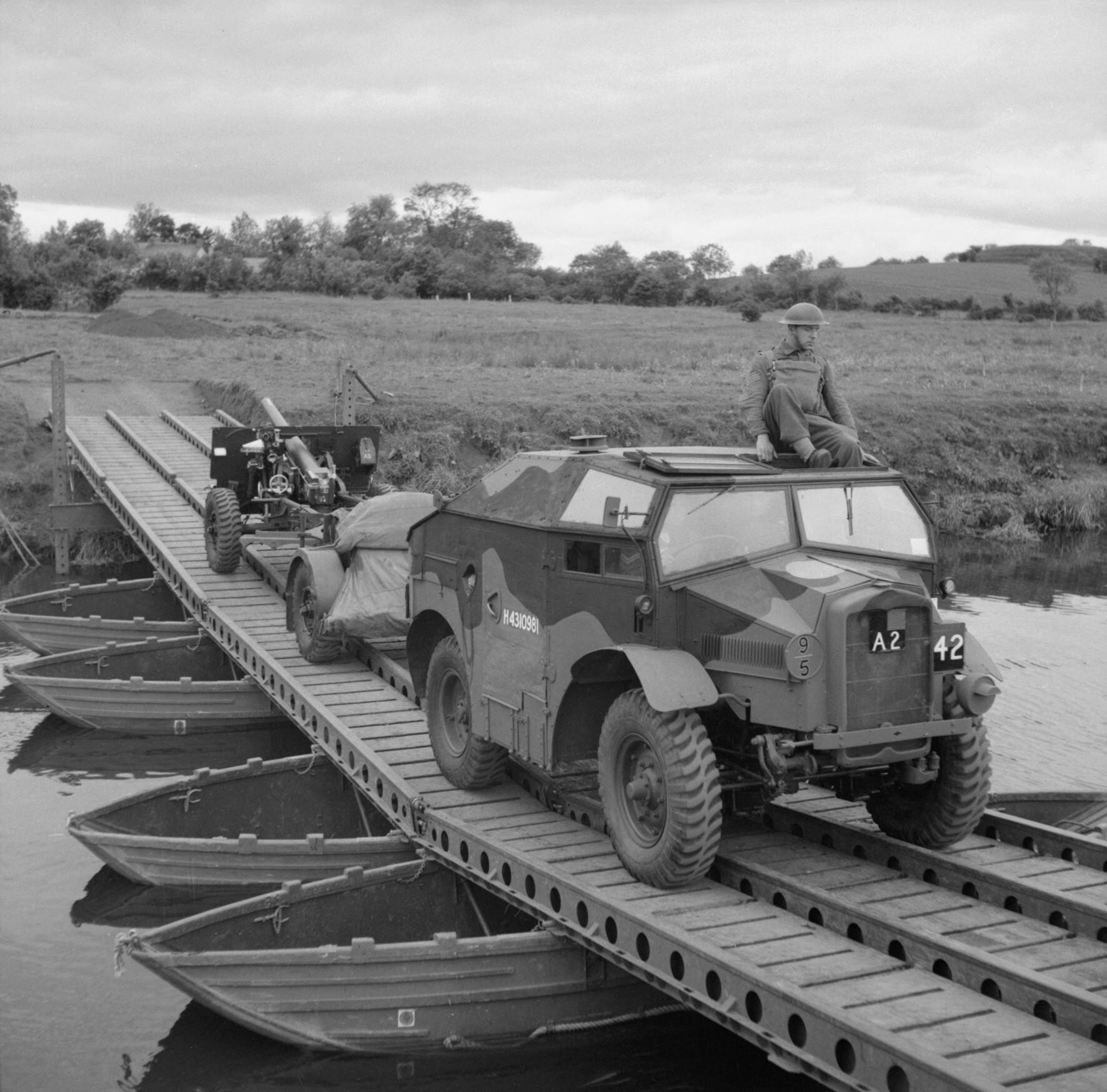
A Morris C8 Quad tractor towing a 25-pdr and limber of 61st Division during exercises in Northern Ireland

119th Field Rgt mobilised in 61st Division and remained with it throughout the war. The division never served outside the United Kingdom. Having trained in Southern Command it was sent to Northern Ireland in June 1940 during the post-Dunkirk invasion crisis, remaining there until February 1943. 119th Field Rgt formed its third battery, 484 Fd Bty, on 27 January 1941 when the regiment was stationed at Derry. It was authorised to adopt its parent unit's 'South Midland' subtitle on 17 February 1942.

61st Division did appear in 21st Army Group's proposed order of battle in the summer of 1943, but it was later replaced by veteran formations brought back from the Mediterranean theatre before Operation Overlord was launched. It remained in reserve in the UK at full establishment until it reorganised as a light division in August 1945.

119th (South Midland) Field Regiment passed into suspended animation on 13 December 1945.

== Postwar ==
When the TA was reconstituted on 1 January 1947 67th (SM) Fd Rgt reformed at Worcester as 267 (South Midland) Field Rgt as part of 88 (Field) Army Group Royal Artillery (AGRA). 119th (SM) Field Rgt was scheduled to reform as 319th (South Midland) Light Anti-Aircraft/Searchlight Rgt, but this was dropped (a completely new 672 Heavy Anti-Aircraft Rgt was formed at Langley instead) and it was formally disbanded.

On 1 July 1951 267 Fd Rgt dropped its 'South Midland' subtitle. On 31 October 1956 it amalgamated with 268 (Warwickshire) Medium Rgt (the former III South Midland Brigade) to form 267 (Worcestershire and Warwickshire) Medium Rgt with the following organisation:

- RHQ at Birmingham
- P Bty at Worcester
- Q Bty at Birmingham, with a detachment at Leamington Spa
- R Bty at Malvern

The TA was reorganised on 1 May 1961 after National Service was abolished. The Birmingham and Leamington Spa elements of 267 (W&W) Med Rgt combined with some other Warwickshire units to form a new 268 (Warwickshire) Fd Rgt, while P and R Btys amalgamated with Q (Malvern) and S (Worcester) Btys of 639 (8th Battalion Worcestershire Regiment) Heavy Rgt to form a new 267 (Worcestershire) Field Rgt based at Redditch, which also absorbed some volunteers from the disbanded HQ of 41 (Anti-Aircraft) AGRA.

When the TA was reduced into the Territorial and Army Volunteer Reserve (TAVR) in 1967 the regiment reformed as the Worcestershire Territorial Regiment, RA, in TAVR III (Home Defence); Brigade HQ of 159 (Welsh Border) Infantry Bde and 7th Bn Worcestershire Regiment (less B Company, which joined the Mercian Volunteers, an infantry unit) also assisted in its formation. It had the following organisation:

- RHQ at Worcester
- P (Worcester) Bty
- Q (Malvern) Bty

The TAVR was further reduced on 1 April 1969, when the regiment became a cadre in the Mercian Volunteers; some members of P Bty were absorbed into a new Worcester detachment of B Company. However, on 1 July that year a new 214 (Worcestershire) Bty of 104 Light Air Defence Regiment, RA, was formed from Q Bty at Malvern, and this continues today at Worcester in the Army Reserve.

== Honorary colonels ==
The following served as Honorary Colonel of the unit:

- Charles Lyne, VD, appointed 9 November 1878
- William Lygon, 7th Earl Beauchamp, KG, KCMG, appointed 5 November 1902
- Lt-Col E.C. Bullock, TD, former CO, appointed 11 May 1932
- Brevet Col William Harcourt Kerr, TD, appointed (to Worcestershire Regiment, RA) 1 April 1967

== Uniforms and insignia ==
Prior to 1880 the unit wore a distinctive design of button on the blue artillery tunic, consisting of a field gun over a tower, within a circle inscribed 'WORCESTER ARTILLERY VOLUNTEERS'. When first formed the unit's headgear was the usual artillery busby; for the officers the ball of the 'grenade' plume holder bore a tower within a garter inscribed 'WORCESTERSHIRE', surmounted by a field gun, the whole surrounded by a wreath, an identical design appearing on the waistbelt clasp. From 1878 the headgear was the standard Home Service helmet.
