= Charles Fullbrook-Leggatt =

British Army general (1889–1972)

Major-General Charles Fullbrook-Leggatt CBE DSO MC
- Born: 16 August 1889; Reading, Berkshire, England
- Died: 29 May 1972 (aged 82); Cromer, Norfolk, England
- Military career
- Allegiance: United Kingdom
- Branch: British Army
- Service years: 1909–1946
- Rank: Major-General
- Service number: 2009
- Unit: Royal Berkshire Regiment
- Commands: 61st Infantry Division; 184th Infantry Brigade; 2nd Battalion, Royal Berkshire Regiment
- Conflicts: First World War; Second World War
- Awards: Commander of the Order of the British Empire; Distinguished Service Order; Military Cross; Mentioned in Despatches (4)

Major-General Charles St Quentin Outen Fullbrook-Leggatt, CBE, DSO, MC (16 August 1889 − 29 May 1972) was a British Army officer who served in both world wars.

== Early life and military career ==
Charles Fullbrook-Leggatt was born on 16 August 1889, the second son of Charles Outen Fullbrook (later Fullbrook-Leggatt), of Knightslee, Reading, Berkshire, and Mary Julia, daughter of writer Rev. Francis Ballard Wells, rector of Woodchurch, Kent. He was educated first at Reading School, later Bath College and the Royal Military College at Sandhurst, from where he graduated on 18 September 1909, being commissioned as a second lieutenant into the Royal Berkshire Regiment of the British Army. Richard O’Connor, a future full general who would serve with distinction throughout his military career, was among his fellow graduates, as was R. F. B. Naylor, who became a major general.

Fullbrook-Leggatt was posted to his regiment's 1st Battalion, was promoted to lieutenant on 17 August 1911, and served with distinction on the Western Front during the First World War, which began in the summer of 1914. Promoted to battalion adjutant on 11 September 1914, he gained one of the first Distinguished Service Orders (DSO) of the war, awarded in December 1914 for actions in late August. Promoted to captain the following year, he ended the war as a brevet major, and had been, in addition to the DSO, awarded the Military Cross (MC) in 1915 and was four times mentioned in dispatches, and wounded in action twice, the first time being at the Battle of Loos in 1915. After recovering from his injury he returned to France and was made brigade major with the 137th Brigade, part of the 46th (North Midland) Division, from 16 March 1917 until 27 March 1918, followed briefly by General Staff Officer Grade 2 (GSO2) with XIX Corps, GSO2 to the 49th (West Riding) Division from 9 April until 12 July, and finally as a GSO2 to the Supreme War Council, Versailles.

== Between the wars ==
As a Regular Army officer, Fullbrook-Leggatt remained in the army during the difficult interwar period, attending the Staff College, Camberley, from 1922 to 1923, alongside future generals such as John Evetts, Gerald Smallwood, Richard Wootten, Robert Money, Douglas Paige, George Beresford, John Martin, Charles Lane, Frank Simmons, Kenneth Gattie, Cecil Heydeman, Thomas Hutton and Douglas McArthur Hogg. After graduating, he was a brigade major with the 9th Infantry Brigade from 16 January 1924 until 1 October 1926.

Fullbrook-Leggatt returned to his regiment in the 1930s, commanding the 2nd Battalion, Royal Berkshires from 1932 to 1936. He then served as an instructor at the Senior Officers' School, Sheerness, a post he held for over three years, from October 1936, until the outbreak of the Second World War in September 1939.

== Second World War ==
On 22 August 1939, just before the outbreak of war, Fullbrook-Leggatt was promoted to the temporary rank of brigadier and was given command of the 184th Infantry Brigade, part of the 61st Infantry Division, then commanded by Major General Robert Collins. The brigade was a second line Territorial Army (TA) formation, only very recently formed as a duplicate of the 145th Infantry Brigade, and was composed largely of part-time civilian soldiers. The outbreak of war saw the brigade mobilised for full-time war service, and training for eventual overseas service in France with the British Expeditionary Force (BEF), although the German invasion of France in May 1940 forestalled this, and the brigade, along with the rest of the 61st Division, now commanded by Major General Adrian Carton de Wiart, moved to Northern Ireland, after the BEF was evacuated from France and there was a possibility of the Germans invading the United Kingdom through Southern Ireland (see Operation Green).

On 6 April 1941, Fullbrook-Leggatt was promoted to the acting rank of major general and succeeded Carton de Wiart as General Officer Commanding (GOC) of the division. In addition to his old 184th Brigade, the division comprised the 182nd and 183rd Infantry Brigades, along with supporting divisional troops. The 61st's responsibility was still that of the defence of Northern Ireland, and the division trained hard in a counterattack role. Fullbrook-Leggatt was only with the division until September 1942, and the following year served on the staff of Allied Forces Headquarters (AFHQ) and, in 1944, becoming an area commander in Italy.

Fullbrook-Leggatt retired from the army in October 1946 and was granted the honorary rank of major general (having still technically been a full colonel).

== Family ==
In 1915 Fullbrook-Leggatt married Mary Katherine (22 June 1891 – 25 January 1972), daughter of Colonel George Hastings Bittleston of Ashleigh, Whitchurch, Devon, and granddaughter of Sir Adam Bittleston, judge of the Madras High Court; they had two daughters:

- Barbara Loveday Fullbrook-Leggatt (1919–2017), who married William John Webb (1910–1994)
- Diana Mary Fullbrook-Leggatt (1923–2016), who married Brigadier Philip Henry Cecil Hayward C.B.E. (1909–1983)

Fullbrook-Leggatt lived out his final years in Cromer, Norfolk, where he died on 29 May 1972, at the age of 82.

== Bibliography ==
- Smart, Nick (2005). Biographical Dictionary of British Generals of the Second World War. Barnsley, South Yorkshire: Pen and Sword Books. ISBN 1844150496.

Military offices
Preceded by Adrian Carton de Wiart	GOC 61st Infantry Division; 1941–1942	Succeeded by John Carpenter
