= Charles Wainwright =

Charles Wainwright may refer to:

- Charles S. Wainwright (1826–1907), Union Army artillery officer
- Charles Wainwright (British Army officer) (1893–1968), British Army officer
