= 61st Infantry Division (United Kingdom) =

Infantry division of the British Army, raised 1939

61st Infantry Division 61st (Light) Division
- The shoulder insignia of the division. Historian Michael Chappell states that the insignia was chosen as a variation of the 48th (South Midland) Infantry Division insignia.
- Active: September 1939 – November 1945
- Country: United Kingdom
- Branch: Territorial Army
- Type: Infantry; Light infantry
- Role: Infantry, home defence, training, and deception
- Size: Division

Commanders
- Notable commanders: Adrian Carton de Wiart; Edmond Schreiber

The 61st Infantry Division was an infantry division of the British Army, raised in 1939 as part of the expansion of the Territorial Army in response to the German occupation of Czechoslovakia. The division was created as a duplicate of the 48th (South Midland) Infantry Division, and was assigned to home defence duties.

While the division was never deployed overseas, its headquarters staff was deployed to Norway and briefly fought in the Norwegian campaign. Afterwards, the division was deployed to Northern Ireland for almost three years as a result of rumours of a German intention to invade. In Northern Ireland, the division manned static defences, conducted internal security, and trained for future operations. Returning to England, the division participated in military exercises and was scheduled to join the 21st Army Group for the Operation Overlord, the Allied invasion of German-occupied France. It lost this role in late 1943, and was assigned to train replacements for combat units. Throughout 1944, the division aided Overlord in various deception formats, while most of the men were posted to combat formations within 21st Army Group. In late 1945, the division was reorganised as a light division and was going to be deployed to the Far East to fight Imperial Japan. The move was cancelled following the Japanese surrender, and the division was disbanded in November 1945.

== Background ==
In the 1930s, tensions increased between Germany and the United Kingdom and its allies. During late 1937 and throughout 1938, German demands for the annexation of Czechoslovakia's Sudetenland led to an international crisis. In an attempt to avoid war, Britain's Prime Minister Neville Chamberlain met with German Chancellor Adolf Hitler in September and brokered the Munich Agreement. The agreement averted immediate war and allowed Germany to annexe the Sudetenland. Chamberlain had intended the agreement to lead to the peaceful resolution of further issues, but relations between both countries continued to deteriorate. On 15 March 1939, Germany breached the terms of the agreement by invading and occupying the remaining provinces of Bohemia and Moravia.

In response, on 29 March, the British Secretary of State for War Leslie Hore-Belisha announced plans to increase the Territorial Army (TA) from 130,000 men to 340,000 and in so doing double the number of TA divisions. (Note: The Territorial Army (TA) was a reserve of the British regular army made up of part-time volunteers. By 1939, its intended role was to be the sole method of expanding the size of the British Armed Forces (compared to the creation of Kitchener's Army during the First World War). First-line territorial formations would create a second-line division using a cadre of trained personnel and if needed, a third division would also be created. All TA recruits were required to take the general service obligation meaning that, if the British Government decided, territorial soldiers could be deployed overseas for combat. (This avoided the complications with the First World War-era Territorial Force, whose members were not required to leave Britain unless they volunteered for overseas service.)) The plan of action was for the existing units to recruit over their allowed establishments (aided by an increase in pay for Territorials, the removal of restrictions on promotion that had been a major hindrance to recruiting during the preceding years, the construction of better-quality barracks and an increase in suppertime rations) and then form second-line divisions from small cadres that could be built upon. As a result, the 61st Infantry Division was to be created as a second-line unit, a duplicate of the first-line 48th (South Midland) Infantry Division. In April, limited conscription was introduced. This involved 34,500 militiamen, all aged 20, who were conscripted into the regular army, initially to be trained for six months before being deployed to the forming second-line units. Despite the intention for the army to grow, the programme was complicated by a lack of central guidance on the expansion and duplication process and issues regarding the lack of facilities, equipment and instructors.

== History ==
=== Initial service ===
It was envisioned that the duplicating process and recruiting the required numbers of men would take no more than six months. Some TA divisions had made little progress by the time the Second World War began; others were able to complete this work within a matter of weeks. By the outbreak of the war, the division was active, under the general officer commanding, Major-General Robert J. Collins, and was composed of the 182nd, 183rd, and 184th Infantry Brigades and supporting elements. Following the division's formation, it was assigned to Southern Command. At the end of November, Major-General Adrian Carton de Wiart took command. The division was spread out, ranging from Birmingham to Portsmouth, and Cheltenham to Reading, and with the headquarters in Oxford. On 15 April, Carton de Wiart, as well as the divisional staff, were deployed to Norway; Major-General Edmond Schreiber assumed command of the 61st Division, and was assigned a new divisional staff.

=== Headquarters deployed to Norway ===
In their opening assault upon Norway, German troops had seized Trondheim. In response, the British Army planned to launch a two-pronged pincer attack to retake the city. The troops to undertake this attack came from the 49th (West Riding) Infantry Division (a first-line TA division), which had already been earmarked for service in Norway prior to the German invasion. The division was temporarily broken up, its brigades acting as individual commands. The 146th Infantry Brigade, which would make up the bulk of Mauriceforce and form the northern pincer began landing on 17 April. Due to time restraints and troops already assigned to the expedition, the 61st Division was not deployed to Norway. Instead, Carton de Wiart was given command of Mauriceforce and was allowed to select his staff, which he drew from his headquarters. The southern pincer, 200 miles (320 km) to the south and separated by mountainous terrain and rivers, was to be undertaken by Major-General Bernard Paget's Sickleforce that had landed at Åndalsnes.

Soon after arriving, the 146th Brigade's leading battalions began to move south. On 21 April, Carton de Wiart's troops engaged in the first encounter of the war between British and German troops. The British, largely confined to the road network and advancing in deep snow, were engaged by a slightly larger German force that was supported by artillery and air support. The Germans, utilizing sledges, motorcycles, and ski-troops were able to outmanoeuvre and force back the British. German follow-up attacks did not materialise, but the Luftwaffe heavily bombed the small port at Namsos. Carton de Wiart cabled the War Office and stated "with my lack of equipment I was quite incapable of advancing on Trondheim and could see very little point in remaining in that part of Norway sitting out like rabbits in the snow". The evacuation was not ordered until the end of the month and then completed in the early days of May, after the loss of 157 men of Mauriceforce. The lack of success in Norway, and the withdrawal of the forces attempting to retake Trondheim, resulted in the collapse of Chamberlain's Government. Carton de Wiart, considered a daring and aggressive commander, was – per historian Jack Adams – "hampered by ... climatic and geographic conditions" and his troops were "inexperienced, poorly prepared and badly backed up".

=== Deployment to Northern Ireland ===
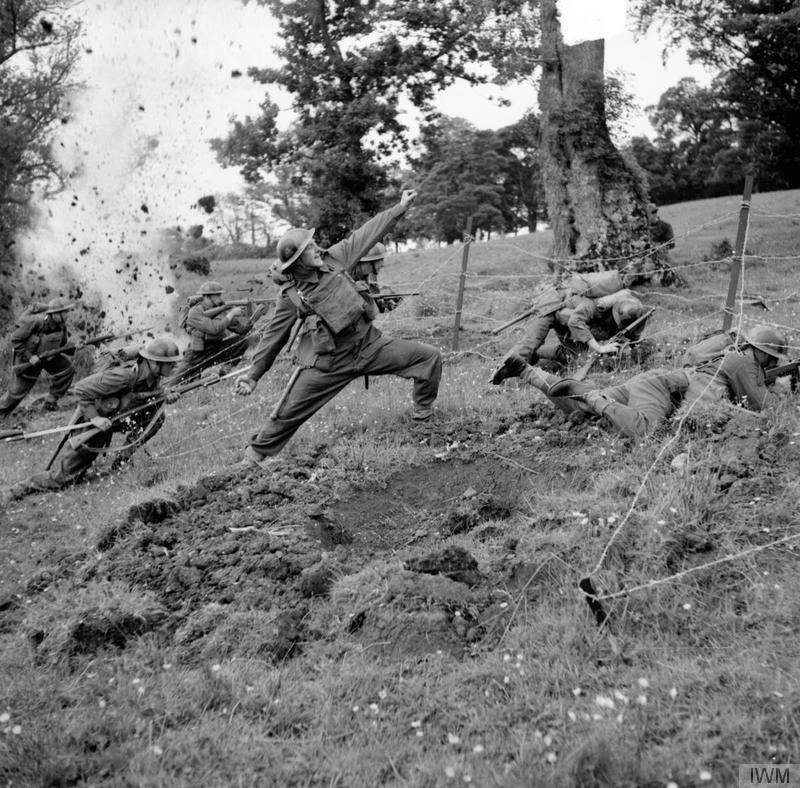
Men of the 6th Battalion, Royal Berkshire Regiment undertaking battle training at Coleraine, Northern Ireland, 16 June 1941.

As early as mid-May 1940, while the Battle of France was still being waged, the British Government began to fear that Germany would immediately launch an invasion of the British Isles. This fear was compounded by, as historian Paul McMahon commented, the "catastrophic Allied defeats" that soon followed, which produced "two hysterias in the summer of 1940: first, fear of imminent invasion and, second, a 'fifth column panic'." The initial fear of invasion was aroused by the alleged capture of German documents, by the Dutch, which contained plans for a German invasion as well as information regarding a simultaneous attack on Ireland by paratroopers who were to be assisted by the Irish Republican Army (IRA). This document, which no longer exists, caused panic within the British Government. The information was reinforced, in the following months, by reports warning of a German intent to invade Ireland from diplomatic missions and the Secret Intelligence Service (SIS). On 14 May, following his return to the United Kingdom, Carton de Wiart resumed command of the 61st Infantry Division; Schreiber had left the division two days previously, to take command of the 45th Infantry Division. After the British Expeditionary Force (BEF) was evacuated from France, the British acted on the rumours of the German intent to invade Ireland, and the decision was made to reinforce the garrison (the 53rd (Welsh) Infantry Division) by deploying the 61st Infantry Division; in the ensuing 12 months, the division would be followed by the 5th and 48th (South Midland) Divisions and the 71st and 72nd Independent Infantry Brigades).

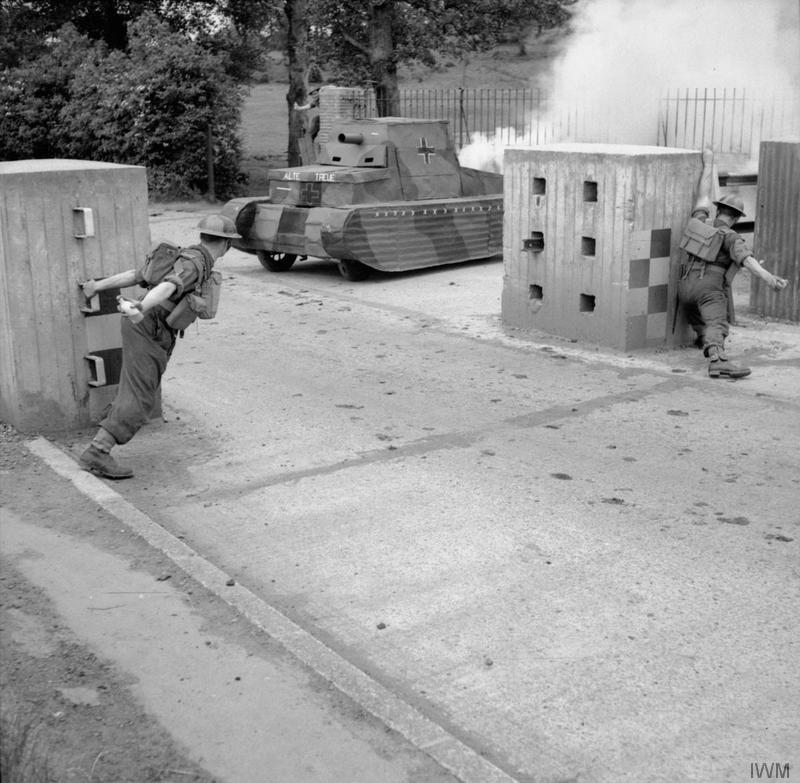
Men of the 6th Royal Berkshire Regiment, manning a roadblock, practice attacking German tanks.

McMahon commented that the SIS had a history of "furnish[ing] unreliable information on the IRA's foreign intrigues", but these past failures were ignored as the reports reinforced the fears of invasion. McMahon suggested that "It is even possible that the plans discovered in Holland were planted. Whether deliberate deception or not, British intelligence was well and truly deceived." Historian Eunan O'Halpin argued that while the Dutch document could be seen as a British fabrication, "it is now known ... that German deception operations prepared in anticipation of Operation 'Sealion' included the manufacturing of rumours and stories of plans to attack Ireland as a feint during the build up to an invasion of Southern England". Nicholas Mansergh commented that "Ireland had no place" in the initial Sealion plans, and it was not until 3 December 1940 that German planners even looked at the possibility before concluding that such an operation was not possible or if launched would result in failure. In his memoirs, Carton de Wiart commented "I can never believe the Germans had any intention of invading Ireland but I am very grateful for any reason which sent us there, for it was an ideal training ground for troops and the division improved enormously from the moment of our arrival."

The 61st moved to Northern Ireland, and came under the command of Northern Ireland District on 20 June. The division was responsible for manning the static defences across Northern Ireland and defending Belfast, as well as being responsible for the internal security of the country. While based across most of Northern Ireland, it was largely positioned within County Antrim, County Londonderry, and County Tyrone, with the divisional headquarters at Ballymena. The division trained to repel seaborne invasions from German forces, as well as airborne landings and small raids. The beaches of County Antrim and Londonderry were seen as the most likely areas for an invasion, and by the end of autumn, concrete pillars, barbed wire entanglements, and camouflaged firing positions had been constructed. During the division's stay in Northern Ireland, Lieutenant-General Henry Pownall took command of British forces in the country. His appointment resulted in Carton de Wiart losing command of the division on grounds of his age (one month shy of his 61st birthday). Carton de Wiart was replaced by Major-General Charles Fullbrook-Leggatt, who assumed command on 6 April 1941.

In June 1942, the division took part in the first major joint Anglo-American exercise with newly arrived U.S. Army troops. This exercise, a 10-day event codenamed Atlantic, saw U.S. V Corps (U.S. 1st Armored Division, the 59th (Staffordshire) Infantry Division, and the British 72nd Infantry Brigade) engage British Forces Northern Ireland (the U.S. 34th and the 61st Infantry). On 15 September, Major-General John Carpenter took command of the division, replacing Fullbrook-Leggatt.

=== Return to England, training, and Operation Overlord ===
The 61st Division returned to England on 4 February 1943, and was based in Essex under the command of XI Corps. Between 4–12 March, the division participated in Exercise Spartan, the largest military exercise ever held in the United Kingdom. David French commented that the exercise "was designed to analyse the problems that would arise after a force had landed on a hostile shore and was advancing from a bridgehead". The exercise revealed weaknesses in elements of the senior leadership, in particular the officers in overall command of the armies deployed for the exercise, and highlighted the improvements made in general by the infantry. Spartan was followed, in April and May, by Exercise Jantzen. This was an administrative undertaking by the division and the headquarters of I Corps, aimed at improving the support techniques that would be used in the upcoming invasion of Europe. (Note: On 22 July, I Corps undertook the physical landing, deploying administration troops and 16,000 tonnes (35,000,000 lb) of stores on a beach in South Wales.) In May, the division was transferred to II Corps, and moved to Kent, after which Major-General Charles Wainwright took command, holding this position until the end of the war. The division was earmarked for a role in Operation Overlord, and Marcus Cunliffe wrote that Exercise Spartan "seemed to be every indication that" the division was to be a front-line unit. In September, the division, in conjunction with the 1st Polish Armoured Division, was placed under the control of II Canadian Corps for Exercise Link. In the months following the exercise, the division was relegated to Lower Establishment status. This meant that the division was now to be strictly used for home defence in a static role compared to Higher Establishment divisions that were intended for deployment overseas and combat. As part of this change in priorities, the division also became a training formation and one intended to find suitable replacements for fighting formations. By October, the division had also been assigned to anti-invasion duties in Kent. While based there, German cross-Channel guns periodically shelled the area, and in 1944 V-1 flying bombs became a minor issue. In December 1943, the division (reinforced, for the exercise, by the 31st Tank Brigade) played the defending force in Exercise Vulcan; a four-day training exercise aimed at improving the attacking process of the 43rd (Wessex) Infantry Division.

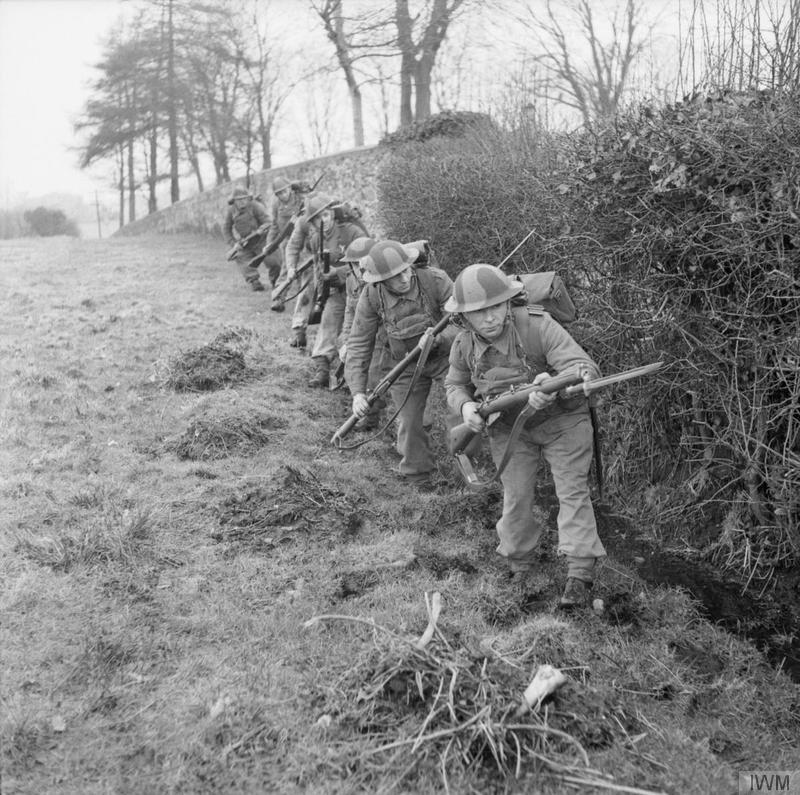
Men of the 4th Battalion, Northamptonshire Regiment training in Omagh, Northern Ireland, 5 February 1942

During 1944, the division aided Operation Overlord in various ways. On 9 April, the 183rd Infantry Brigade ceased to exist as a formation and formed HQ Residue Concentration Area (Note: The elements of the assault divisions, which would not be needed during the initial phase of Overlord, were detached and based in residue camps awaiting the order for embarkation to join their parent units following the assault.) to aid the invasion preparation. The 4th Battalion, Northamptonshire Regiment and the 10th Battalion, Worcestershire Regiment were attached to 21st Army Group to aid 185th Camouflage Field Company, Royal Engineers. The men of the 4th Northamptonshire Regiment created 150 fake Landing Craft Tanks (LCTs), made from steel tubing and canvas, and positioned them along the River Deben at Ipswich, as well as at Oulton Broad, Lowestoft and Great Yarmouth. The 10th Worcestershire Regiment constructed fake landing craft at Dover, Folkestone, and Harwich, in addition to fake LCTs on the River Orwell. By 6 June, the battalion had constructed 122 such dummy displays. In May, as part of Operation Fortitude, Juan Pujol García (the British double agent known as Garbo) reported to the Germans that the division was ostensibly based around Brighton and Newhaven. Here, along with the 45th Infantry Division and Royal Marines, it allegedly took part in the build-up of the notional First United States Army Group (FUSAG). (Note: 'Fortitude South' aimed to convince the Germans that FUSAG had 500,000 men in more than fifty divisions and would launch the main Allied invasion in the Pas de Calais, 45 days after the Normandy landings. The goal of the operation was to persuade the Germans not to move the 18 divisions of the 15th Army to Normandy.) The division was then made part of the fictional British VII Corps, part of the equally fake Fourth Army, and "travelled" to Scotland before returning south to FUSAG. Furthermore, signallers from the division maintained wireless traffic to give the Germans the impression that VII Corps also included the notional 80th Division.

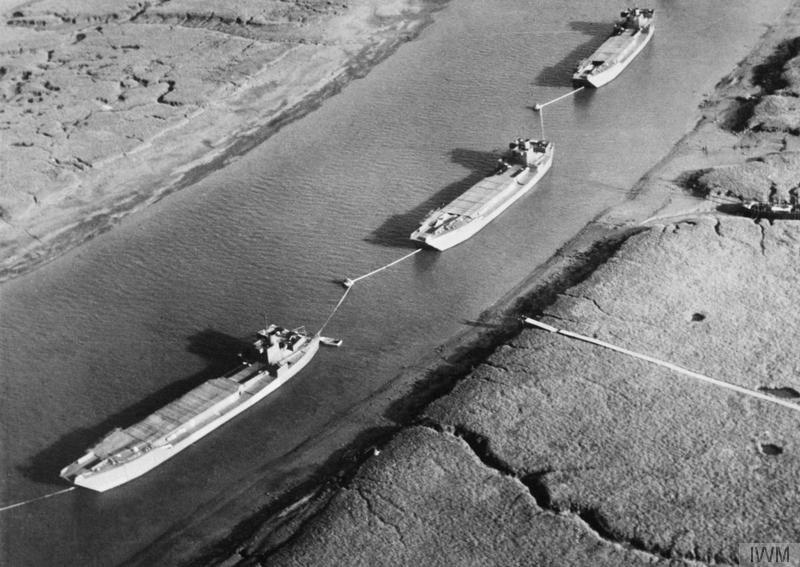
An example of deployed decoy Landing Craft Tanks.

By mid-1944, the five Lower Establishment divisions allocated to home defence duties (the 38th (Welsh), the 45th, the 47th (London), the 55th (West Lancashire), and the 61st) had a combined total of 17,845 men. Of this number, around 13,000 were available as replacements for the 21st Army Group fighting in France. (Note: The war establishment – the paper strength – of a Higher Establishment infantry division by this point in the war was 18,347 men.) The remaining 4,800 men were considered ineligible at that time for service abroad for a variety of reasons, including a lack of training or being medically unfit. Over the following six months, up to 75 per cent of these men would be deployed to reinforce 21st Army Group following the completion of their training and certification of fitness. For example, those eligible for overseas service from the 9th Battalion, Worcestershire Regiment, were transferred to 21st Army Group. The battalion was then tasked with training those who were considered unfit, re-training soldiers who had recovered from wounds, and training men from anti-aircraft units to become infantry. (Note: By this point in the war, the British Army was facing a manpower crisis as it did not have enough men to replace the losses to front-line infantry. In an effort to alleviate the issue, men from the Royal Artillery and Royal Air Force (RAF) were retrained as infantry.) On 18 July, HQ Residue Concentration Area reverted to its former infantry role. Two days later, the brigade staff of 184th Infantry Brigade became the headquarters of 183rd Infantry Brigade and likewise the headquarters staff of the 183rd became HQ 184th Infantry Brigade. In August, the 4th Northamptonshire was transferred to Force 135 that was planning to end the German occupation of the Channel Islands. Such an attack did not materialise, and the entire force was transferred to Europe to reinforce the 21st Army Group. On 1 September, the 184th Infantry Brigade (while remaining part of the division) was transferred to the Orkney and Shetland Islands for a two-month stint as the defensive garrison. Over the remainder of the year, and into 1945, the makeup of the division changed but its role remained the same. For example, the role of 4th Battalion, Devonshire Regiment, was to find drafts for other battalions fighting overseas.

=== Light division, and disbandment ===
In August 1945, at the conclusion of the war in Europe, the 61st Division was reorganised as a light division. The light division concept had been undertaken during the Burma campaign following the initial defeats. Historian F.W. Perry commented that the Indian Army concluded that "existing Indian formations were over-mechanised and road-bound". Therefore, the surviving 17th Indian Division was reorganised as a light division. This included being reduced to two infantry brigades, all non-cross country capable vehicles being replaced with mules, jeeps, and four-wheel drive trucks, and the field artillery either completely replaced by pack howitzers or mechanised. These changes greatly increased the off-road mobility, and the increase in pack animals allowed it to operate away from a road network for an extended period of time.

The 61st Division retained its three infantry brigades, although there were changes to the divisional troops along the above lines. It was intended that the division would be able to be transferred by air to any theatre of war, and its personnel trained to fight in any terrain encountered. Once on the ground, the entire division would be mobile utilizing only jeeps. To help adapt to this new role, training exercises were carried out. The initial destination for the division was the Far East to support the fight against Imperial Japan, but the Japanese surrender resulted in the move being cancelled, and the division never left the United Kingdom. In November 1945, the division, over six years after it was formed, was disbanded.

== Order of battle ==
61st Infantry Division

182nd Infantry Brigade

Main article: 182nd Infantry Brigade
- 2/7th Battalion, Royal Warwickshire Regiment
- 9th Battalion, Royal Warwickshire Regiment (until 25 July 1944)
- 9th Battalion, Worcestershire Regiment
- 182nd Infantry Brigade anti-tank company (from 2 September 1940, until 6 October 1941)
- 1st Battalion, South Wales Borderers (from 2 September 1944)

183rd Infantry Brigade

Main article: 183rd Infantry Brigade
- 4th Battalion, Northamptonshire Regiment (until 28 August 1944)
- 7th Battalion, Gloucestershire Regiment (until 8 April 1944)
- 10th Battalion, Worcestershire Regiment (until 8 April 1944, then from 8 October until 4 November 1944)
- 183rd Infantry Brigade anti-tank company (from 23 September 1940 until 11 May 1941)
- 7th Battalion, North Staffordshire Regiment (from 21 July 1944)
- 1st Battalion, Sherwood Foresters (from 2 August 1944, until 16 June 1945)
- 4th Battalion, Devonshire Regiment (from 19 June 1945)
- 5th Battalion, Somerset Light Infantry (from 18 June 1945)
- 1st Battalion, Duke of Cornwall's Light Infantry (from 19 June 1945)

184th Infantry Brigade

Main article: 184th Infantry Brigade
- 5th Battalion, Oxfordshire and Buckinghamshire Light Infantry (until 5 July 1944)
- 2nd Buckinghamshire Battalion, Oxfordshire and Buckinghamshire Light Infantry (until 5 July 1944)
- 6th Battalion, Royal Berkshire Regiment (until 19 July 1944, then from 3 September 1944 until 31 August 1945)
- 184th Infantry Brigade anti-tank company (from 2 September 1940 until 6 September 1941)
- 2nd Battalion, Queen's Own Royal West Kent Regiment (from 23 July 1944)
- 2nd Battalion, East Surrey Regiment (from 4 August 1944)
- 1st Battalion, Sherwood Foresters (from 17 June 1945)

Divisional Troops

- 61st Divisional artillery, Royal Artillery
  - 119th (South Midland) Field Regiment
  - 120th (South Midland) Field Regiment (until 30 June 1944)
  - 145th (Berkshire Yeomanry) Field Regiment (until 26 January 1944, then from 4 August 1944 until 16 January 1945)
  - 96th (Royal Devon Yeomanry) Field Regiment (from 26 June 1944 until 16 January 1945)
  - 141st (Queen's Own Dorset Yeomanry) Field Regiment (from 14 June 1945)
  - 169th Light Regiment (from 8 June 1945)
  - 63rd Anti-Tank Regiment (until 2 July 1940, then from 21 June 1941 until 22 August 1944)
  - 71st Anti-Tank Regiment (from 12 April 1941 until 20 June 1941)
  - 92nd Anti-Tank Regiment (from 20 October 1944 until 15 June 1945)
  - 103rd Light Anti-Aircraft Regiment (from 24 February 1943 until 1 March 1944)
  - 148th (Warwickshire) Light Anti-Aircraft Regiment, Royal Artillery (from 2 March 1944 until 15 August 1945)
- 61st Divisional Engineers, Royal Engineers
  - 266th Field Company
  - 267th Field Company
  - 268th Field Company
  - 269th Field Park Company (from 18 January 1940)
- 61st Divisional Signals, Royal Corps of Signals
- 61st Reconnaissance Battalion, Reconnaissance Corps (14 September 1941 until 5 June 1942)
- 61st Reconnaissance Regiment, Reconnaissance Corps (from 6 June until 31 December 1943) (Note: In June 1942, the Reconnaissance Corps universally adopted cavalry nomenclature. As a result, all battalions were redesignated as regiments.)
- 61st Reconnaissance Regiment, Royal Armoured Corps (from 1 January 1944 until 23 January 1944)
- Yorkshire Hussars (from 24 January 1944 until 16 June 1945 as the divisional reconnaissance regiment)
- 2nd Battalion, King's Royal Rifle Corps (from 29 July 1945, as the divisional reconnaissance regiment)
- 2/8th Battalion, Middlesex Regiment (Machine-gun battalion; from 11 November 1941 until 20 May 1942)
- 4th Battalion, Cheshire Regiment (from 29 October 1943 until 20 September 1944 as the divisional support battalion, then from 1 July 1944 until 20 September 1944 as the divisional machine-gun battalion)
- 2nd Battalion, Cheshire Regiment (from 1 July 1945, as the divisional machine-gun battalion)

== See also ==
- List of British divisions in World War II
- British Army Order of Battle (September 1939)
