= Charles Wainwright (British Army officer) =

British army officer and ornithologist (1893–1968)

Major-General Charles Wainwright CB
- Born: 17 August 1893
- Died: 23 October 1968 (aged 75)
- Military career
- Allegiance: United Kingdom
- Branch: British Army
- Service years: 1914–1948
- Rank: Major-General
- Service number: 18120
- Unit: Royal Artillery
- Commands: 61st Infantry Division (1943–1945); 54th (East Anglian) Infantry Division (1943); 183rd Infantry Brigade (1939–1940)
- Conflicts: First World War; Second World War
- Awards: Companion of the Order of the Bath; King Haakon VII Freedom Cross (Norway)

Major-General Charles Brian Wainwright, CB (17 August 1893 − 23 October 1968) was a British Army officer.

== Early life ==
Wainwright was born on 17 August 1893 and educated at Wellington College, Berkshire, and Lincoln College, Oxford, where he was part of the University Officers' Training Corps.

== Military career ==
Wainwright was commissioned a second lieutenant in the British Army on 20 June 1914, and allocated to the Royal Artillery in August. He spent much of the First World War attached to the Royal Flying Corps. He was married in 1917.

Remaining in the army during the difficult interwar period, Wainwright was an instructor at the School of Artillery, Larkhill for many years, and was promoted to major in 1932 and a colonel in 1939. By the outbreak of the Second World War he was commanding the 183rd Infantry Brigade on Salisbury Plain. Wainwright was appointed to command a corps' medium artillery from 1940 to 1941, when he became Commander, Royal Artillery (CRA) for the 51st Division in the North African campaign in 1942. He was CRA to the 79th Division in 1943.

Wainwright was granted the acting rank of major-general from 14 April 1943 on assuming command of the 54th (East Anglian) Infantry Division. He was with the division for scarcely a month, however, when he was appointed General Officer Commanding (GOC) of the 61st Infantry Division, an infantry formation under Home Forces. For his war services, Wainwright was appointed a Companion of the Order of the Bath in the 1946 New Year Honours, and was later awarded the Norwegian King Haakon VII Freedom Cross. He retired from the army on 27 October 1948.

== Duck conservation and later life ==
Wainwright became Director of the Duck Ringing Research Station at Abberton Reservoir in Essex. Described as a "prime mover in the scientific study of migrating wildfowl", he lobbied for the Abberton site to be declared a nature reserve and it was said that he individually ringed over 100,000 birds. He lived near Colchester during this time and was a member of the council of the Wildfowl Trust.

== Bibliography ==
- Smart, Nick (2005). Biographical Dictionary of British Generals of the Second World War. Barnsley, South Yorkshire: Pen and Sword Books. ISBN 1844150496.

Military offices
Preceded by Evelyn Barker	GOC 54th (East Anglian) Infantry Division; April–May 1943	Succeeded by Colin Callander
Preceded by John Carpenter	GOC 61st Infantry Division; 1943–1945	Post disbanded
