= John Carpenter (British Army officer) =

British Army officer

Major-General John Carpenter CBE MC
- Born: 20 June 1894
- Died: 28 February 1967 (aged 72)
- Military career
- Allegiance: United Kingdom
- Branch: British Army
- Rank: Major-General
- Service number: 1203
- Commands: 214th Independent Brigade; 61st Infantry Division; Catterick Area
- Conflicts: First World War; Second World War
- Awards: Commander of the Order of the British Empire; Military Cross

Major-General John Owen Carpenter, CBE, MC (20 June 1894 − 28 February 1967) was a senior British Army officer.

== Military career ==
Carpenter was commissioned into the East Surrey Regiment and saw action in the First World War for which he was awarded the Military Cross. He went on to become Assistant Commandant of the Small Arms School in India in 1932. He served in the Second World War as commander of 214th Independent Brigade in February 1941, as General Officer Commanding 61st Infantry Division from September 1942 and as General Officer Commanding Catterick Area from 1943 until he retired in 1946.

He was appointed a Commander of the Order of the British Empire in the 1942 Birthday Honours.

== Bibliography ==
- Smart, Nick (2005). Biographical Dictionary of British Generals of the Second World War. Barnsley, South Yorkshire: Pen and Sword Books. ISBN 1844150496.

Military offices
Preceded by Charles Fullbrook-Leggatt	GOC 61st Infantry Division; 1942−1943	Succeeded by Charles Wainwright
