= Adam Bittleston =

Indian judge

Sir Adam Bittleston (12 September 1817 – 18 January 1892) was a British-born Indian judge who served as an acting chief justice of Madras High Court.

== Early life and education ==
He was the son of Thomas Bittleston, editor of The Morning Post and an official assignee of the Birmingham District Court of Bankruptcy and his wife, Ann. He was named after his paternal grandfather, surveyor Adam Bittleston, of Maryport, Cumberland (now Cumbria).

Bittleston was educated at the Merchant Taylors' School until 1834, and was called to the bar by the Inner Temple in 1841.

== Career ==
Bittleston practised on the Midland Circuit and from 1850, was a revising barrister. In 1858, he was appointed a puisne judge at the Supreme Court of Judicature at Madras and therefore, created a Knight Bachelor. After the Indian High Courts Act 1861, Bittleston switched to the new established Madras High Court and served as acting chief justice, in 1866 and 1867. He retired in 1870, and returned to England.

== Personal life ==
In 1844, he married Rebecca Ann, eldest daughter of George Hastings Heppel, of Princes Street and Mansion House Street, London, an actuary and former paper mill owner, who had also made a fortune as a fruiterer supplying to public dinners. Bittleston died in 1892, at Weybridge. Their children included Adam Henry Bittleston, George Hastings Bittleston, John Pattison Bittleston, and Thomas George Bittleston. Colonel George Hastings Bittleston, D.S.O., C.B.E., of Ashleigh, Whitchurch, Devon, late of the Royal Artillery, was father of Mary Katharine, who married Major-General Charles Fullbrook-Leggatt, C.B.E., D.S.O., M.C.
