= Martinpuich =

- Commune
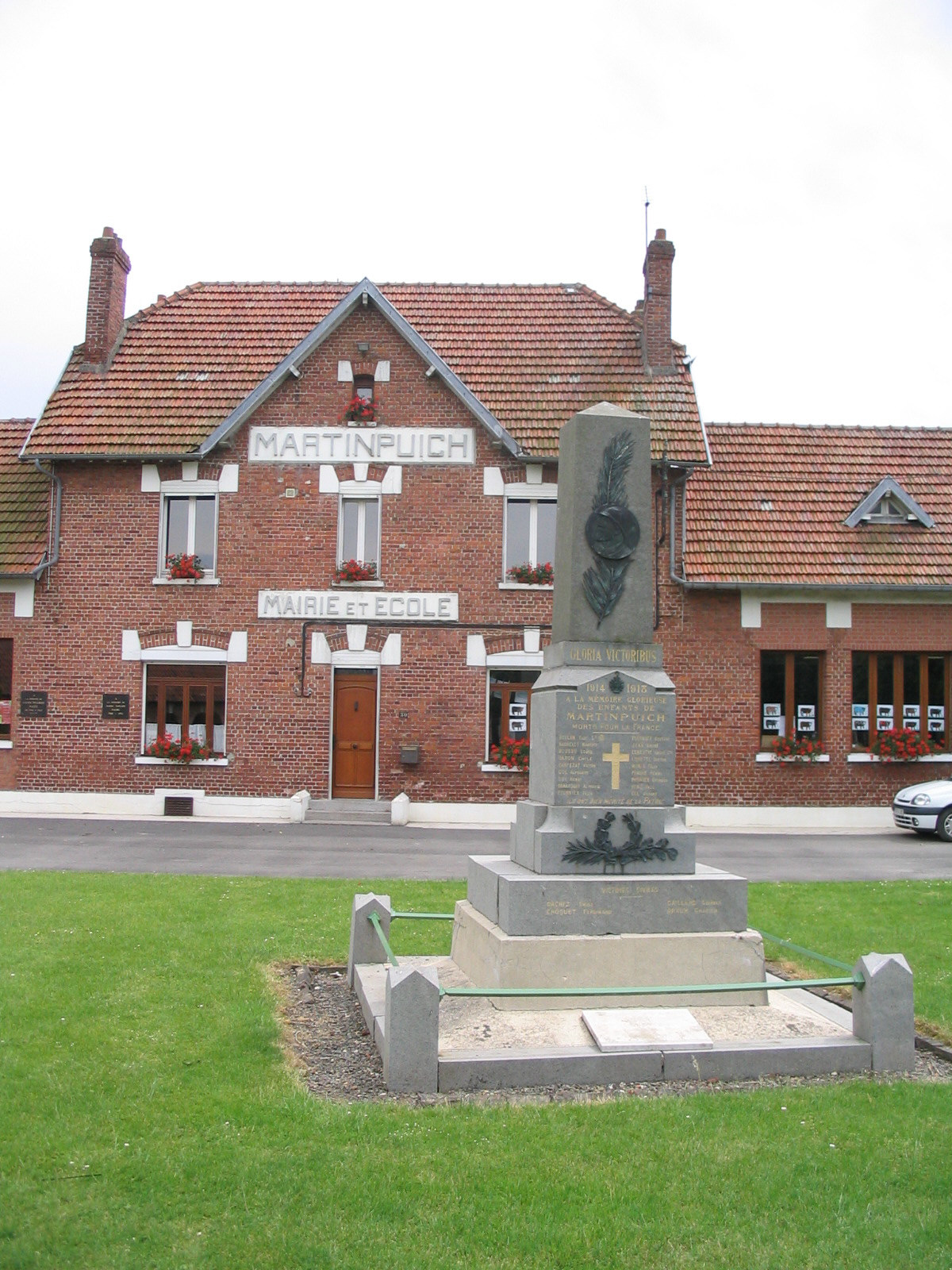
- The town hall, school and monument to the dead of Martinpuich

- Coat of arms
- Location of Martinpuich
- Location within France Location within Hauts-de-France
- Coordinates: 50°03′02″N 2°45′56″E
- Country: France
- Region: Hauts-de-France
- Department: Pas-de-Calais
- Arrondissement: Arras
- Canton: Bapaume
- Intercommunality: CC Sud-Artois

Government
  - Mayor (2020–2026): Jean-François Dercourt
- Area^{1}: 5.96 km^{2} (2.30 sq mi)
- Elevation: 141 m (463 ft)
- Highest elevation: 158 m (518 ft)
- Lowest elevation: 110 m (360 ft)
- Population (2023): 173
  - Density: 29.0/km^{2} (75.2/sq mi)
- Time zone: UTC+01:00 (CET)
  - Summer (DST): UTC+02:00 (CEST)
- INSEE/Postal code: 62561 /62450
- ^{1} French Land Register data, which excludes lakes, ponds, glaciers > 1 km^{2} (0.386 sq mi or 247 acres) and river estuaries.

Martinpuich is a commune in the Pas-de-Calais department in the Hauts-de-France region of France 18 miles (29 km) south of Arras.

== Population ==
Historical population
Year	Pop.	±% p.a.
1968	281	—
1975	243	−2.05%
1982	228	−0.91%
1990	216	−0.67%
1999	209	−0.37%
2007	200	−0.55%
2012	199	−0.10%
2017	196	−0.30%
2023	173	−2.06%
Source: INSEE

== See also ==
- Capture of Martinpuich
- Communes of the Pas-de-Calais department
