= Hiermont =

- Commune
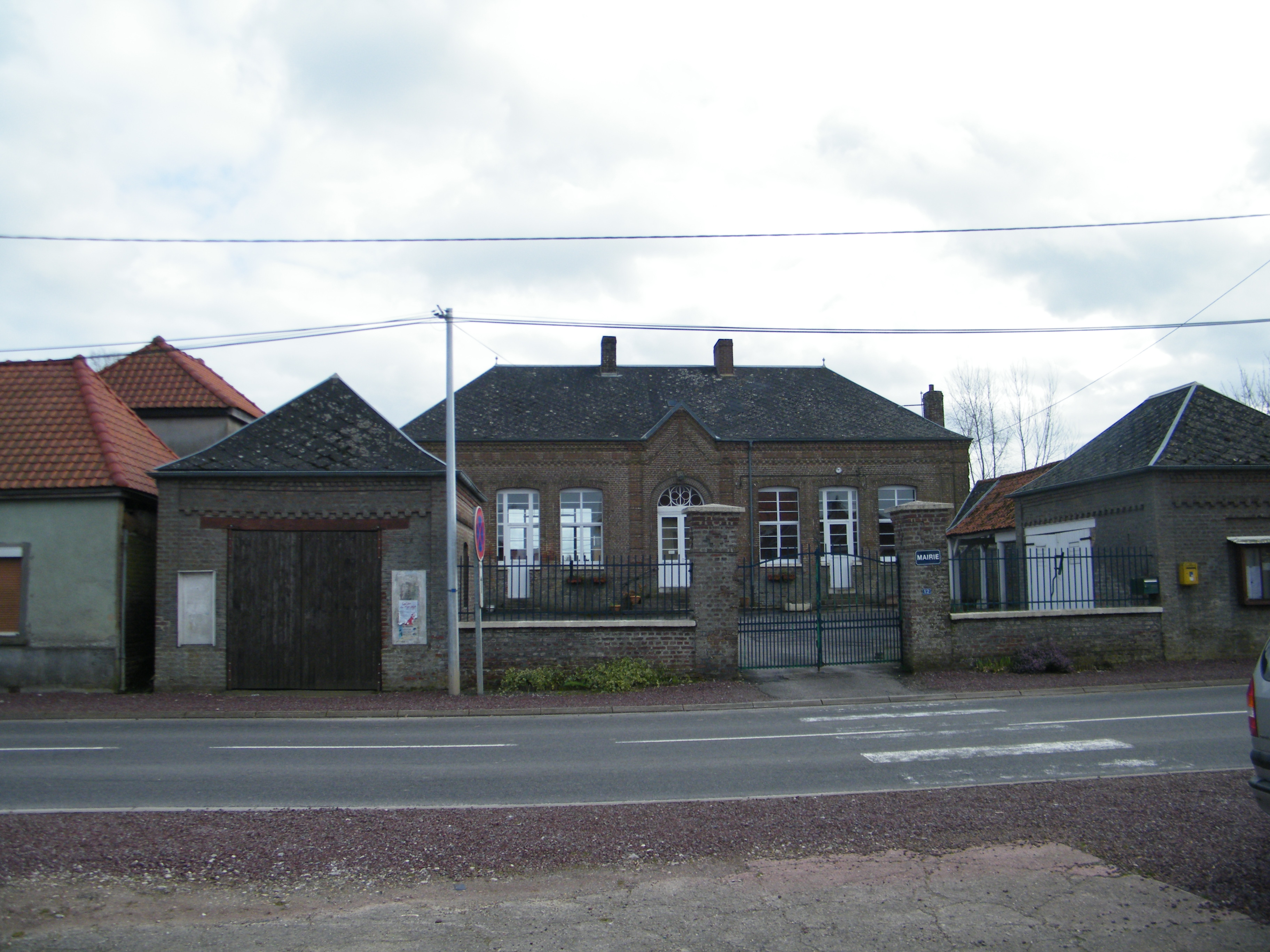
- The town hall in Hiermont

- Coat of arms
- Location of Hiermont
- Location within France Location within Hauts-de-France
- Coordinates: 50°11′46″N 2°04′37″E
- Country: France
- Region: Hauts-de-France
- Department: Somme
- Arrondissement: Amiens
- Canton: Doullens
- Intercommunality: CC Territoire Nord Picardie

Government
  - Mayor (2020–2026): Audrey Carpentier
- Area^{1}: 5.01 km^{2} (1.93 sq mi)
- Elevation: 102 m (335 ft)
- Highest elevation: 125 m (410 ft)
- Lowest elevation: 70 m (230 ft)
- Population (2023): 150
  - Density: 30/km^{2} (78/sq mi)
- Time zone: UTC+01:00 (CET)
  - Summer (DST): UTC+02:00 (CEST)
- INSEE/Postal code: 80440 /80370
- ^{1} French Land Register data, which excludes lakes, ponds, glaciers > 1 km^{2} (0.386 sq mi or 247 acres) and river estuaries.

Hiermont (French pronunciation: [jɛʁmɔ̃]) is a commune in the Somme department in Hauts-de-France in northern France.

== Geography ==
Hiermont is situated on the D941 road, some 15 miles (24 km) northeast of Abbeville.

== Population ==
Historical population
Year	Pop.	±% p.a.
1968	207	—
1975	185	−1.59%
1982	165	−1.62%
1990	171	+0.45%
1999	167	−0.26%
2007	128	−3.27%
2012	141	+1.95%
2017	150	+1.25%
2023	150	+0.00%
Source: INSEE

== See also ==
- Communes of the Somme department
