= 183rd (2nd Gloucester and Worcester) Brigade =

2/1st Gloucester and Worcester Brigade 183rd (2/1st Gloucester and Worcester) Brigade 183rd Infantry Brigade
- Active: 1914–1919; 1939–1945
- Country: United Kingdom
- Branch: Territorial Army
- Type: Infantry
- Size: Brigade
- Part of: 61st (2nd South Midland) Division; 61st Infantry Division

The 183rd (2nd Gloucester and Worcester) Brigade was an infantry brigade formation of the British Army in both World Wars

== First World War ==
The brigade was formed during the First World War in 1914, as a duplicate of the 144th (1/1st Gloucester and Worcester) Brigade, from men in the Territorial Force who, for various reasons, did not volunteer to serve overseas when asked at the outbreak of war. As a result, the brigade acted mainly in a reserve role, sending drafts of trained infantrymen to the 144th Brigade, and it also acted in a home defence role. Assigned to the 61st (2nd South Midland) Division, the brigade served on the Western Front from May 1916.

=== Order of battle ===
The brigade was composed as follows:

- 2/4th (City of Bristol) Battalion, Gloucestershire Regiment (disbanded February 1918)
- 2/6th Battalion, Gloucestershire Regiment (disbanded 1918)
- 2/7th Battalion, Worcestershire Regiment (disbanded February 1918)
- 2/8th Battalion, Worcestershire Regiment (to February 1918)
- 183rd Machine Gun Company, Machine Gun Corps (formed 19 June 1916, moved to 61st Battalion, Machine Gun Corps 1 March 1918)
- 183rd Trench Mortar Battery (formed 27 June 1916)
- 1/9th Battalion, Royal Scots (from February to June 1918)
- 1/5th Battalion, Gordon Highlanders (from February to June 1918)
- 1/8th Battalion, Argyll and Sutherland Highlanders (from February to June 1918)
- 9th (Service) Battalion, Northumberland Fusiliers (from June 1918)
- 11th (Service) Battalion, Suffolk Regiment (Cambridgeshire) (from June 1918)
- 1st Battalion, East Lancashire Regiment(from June 1918)

== Second World War ==
The brigade disbanded in 1919 after the war, along with the rest of the Territorial Force which was later reformed in 1920 as the Territorial Army. Throughout the spring and summer of 1939, the Territorial Army was doubled in size as a consequence of war with Nazi Germany becoming an increasing possibility. Subsequently, the brigade was reformed in the Territorial Army, now as the 183rd Infantry Brigade, in 1939, shortly before the outbreak of the Second World War in September. The brigade was assigned to the 61st Infantry Division. However, the brigade never saw active service overseas and remained in the United Kingdom throughout the war, including a few months spent on anti-invasion duties in Northern Ireland.

=== Order of battle ===
The brigade was originally composed as follows:

- 7th Battalion, Gloucestershire Regiment (transferred to 213th Infantry Brigade, 76th Infantry Division, 8 April 1944)
- 10th Battalion, Worcestershire Regiment (to 8 April 1944)
- 4th Battalion, Northamptonshire Regiment (to 8 April 1944)* 183rd Infantry Brigade Anti-Tank Company (formed 23 September 1940, left September 1941 to join 61st Reconnaissance Battalion)

On 9 April 1944 Brigade HQ ceased to command its units and became 'HQ Residue Concentration Area' in preparation for Operation Overlord. On 18 July 1944 it reverted to its normal role and new units came under command:

- 4th Battalion, Northamptonshire Regiment (returned 21 July, left 28 August 1944)
- 7th Battalion, North Staffordshire Regiment (joined 21 July 1944)
- 1st Battalion, Sherwood Foresters (joined 2 August 1944, to 184 Brigade 16 June 1945)
- 10th Battalion, Worcestershire Regiment (returned 8 October, left 4 November 1944)
- 5th Battalion, Somerset Light Infantry (joined 18 June 1945)
- 4th Battalion, Devonshire Regiment (joined 19 June 1945)
- 1st Battalion, Duke of Cornwall's Light Infantry (joined 19 June 1945)

On 21 July 1944 183 Brigade exchanged its commander and HQ staff with 184 Brigade; there were no changes in units assigned.
