= 184th (2nd South Midland) Brigade =

2/1st South Midland Brigade 184th (2/1st South Midland) Brigade 184th Infantry Brigade
- Active: 1914–1919; 1939–1945
- Country: United Kingdom
- Branch: Territorial Army
- Type: Infantry
- Size: Brigade
- Part of: 61st (2nd South Midland) Division; 61st Infantry Division
- Engagements: First World War

Commanders
- Notable commanders: Andrew Thorne

The 184th (2nd South Midland) Brigade was an infantry brigade formation of the British Army raise for service in both the First and the Second World Wars.

== First World War ==
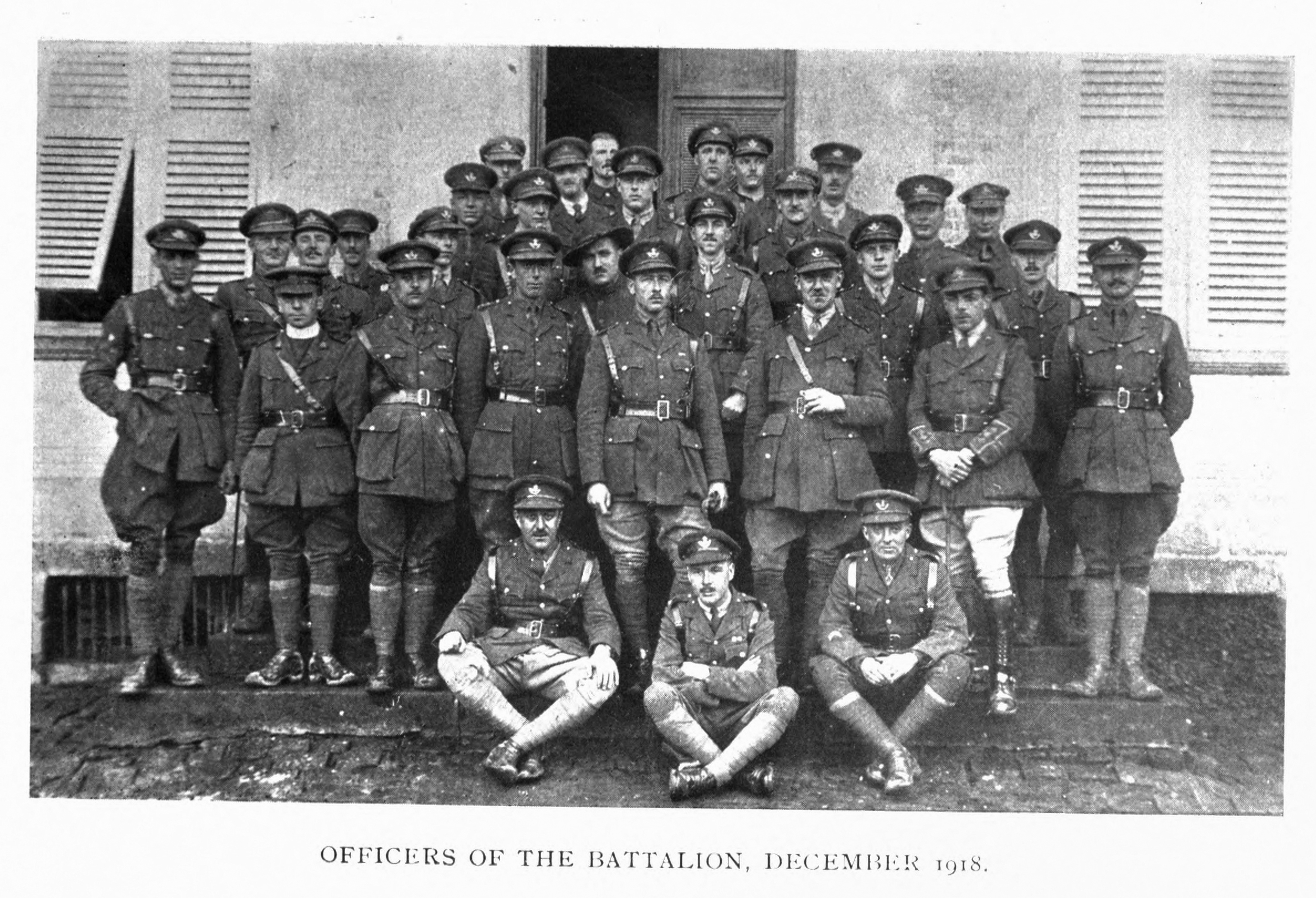
Officers of the 2/4th OBLI, December 1918.

The brigade was raised as a duplicate of the 145th (1/1st South Midland) Brigade and consisted of those men in the Territorial Force who had not volunteered for overseas service when asked at the outbreak of war. It originally acted as a reserve to the 145th Brigade, sending drafts of officers and men as battle-casualty replacements and participated in home defence duties. It was assigned to the 61st (2nd South Midland) Division and, from May 1916 onwards, served on the Western Front in the trenches. In April 1917 Company Sergeant Major Edward Brooks of the 2/4th Battalion, Oxfordshire and Buckinghamshire Light Infantry was awarded the Victoria Cross.

=== Order of battle ===
The brigade was composed as follows:

- 2/5th Battalion, Gloucestershire Regiment
- 2/4th Battalion, Oxfordshire and Buckinghamshire Light Infantry
- 2/1st Buckinghamshire Battalion, Oxfordshire and Buckinghamshire Light Infantry (disbanded February 1918)
- 2/4th Battalion, Royal Berkshire Regiment
- 184th Machine Gun Company, Machine Gun Corps (formed 20 June 1916, moved to 61st Battalion, Machine Gun Corps 1 March 1918)
- 184th Trench Mortar Battery(formed 27 June 1916)

== Second World War ==
The brigade was disbanded after the war in 1919, along with the rest of the Territorial Force which was reformed in the 1920s as the Territorial Army. In early 1939, war with Nazi Germany was becoming increasingly likely and, as a result, the Territorial Army was ordered to be doubled in size, in order to meet the threat. The brigade was reformed, now as the 184th Infantry Brigade, in 1939, prior to the outbreak of the Second World War and consisted of units from the South Midlands area of England. It was assigned to the 61st Infantry Division. However, despite being raised for service in war, the brigade never saw active service abroad and remained in the United Kingdom throughout the war, acting in a training role. In July 1945 the division was reorganised as a light division in preparation for a deployment to the Far East to fight the Imperial Japanese Army. However, the Japanese surrendered in August 1945 and the move cancelled.

=== Order of battle ===
184th Infantry Brigade was constituted as follows during the Second World War:

- 5th Battalion, Oxfordshire and Buckinghamshire Light Infantry (disbanded July 1944)
- 2nd Buckinghamshire Battalion, Oxfordshire and Buckinghamshire Light Infantry (disbanded July 1944)
- 6th Battalion, Royal Berkshire Regiment
- 184th Infantry Brigade Anti-Tank Company (formed 2 September 1940, left 6 September 1941 to join 61st Reconnaissance Battalion)
- 2nd Battalion, Queen's Own Royal West Kent Regiment (from 23 July 1944)
- 2nd Battalion, East Surrey Regiment (from 2 August 1944)
- 1st Battalion, Sherwood Foresters (from 16 June 1945)
