= 2/1st Black Watch Brigade =

- Active: January 1915–November 1915
- Country: United Kingdom
- Branch: British Army
- Type: Infantry
- Size: Brigade
- HQ: Hawick, then Bridge of Earn
- Service: World War I

Commanders
- Notable commanders: The Duke of Montrose

The 2/1st Black Watch Brigade was a 2nd Line Territorial Force infantry brigade of the British Army in World War I. The brigade was formed as a duplicate of the Black Watch Brigade in January 1915. As the name would suggest, it was organized with four battalions of the Black Watch (Royal Highlanders), It was dissolved in November 1915 as its constituent battalions were posted to other formations.

== History ==
In accordance with the Territorial and Reserve Forces Act 1907 (7 Edw.7, c.9) which brought the Territorial Force into being, the TF was intended to be a home defence force for service during wartime and members could not be compelled to serve outside the country. However, on the outbreak of war on 4 August 1914, many members volunteered for Imperial Service. Therefore, TF units were split into 1st Line (liable for overseas service) and 2nd Line (home service for those unable or unwilling to serve overseas) units. 2nd Line units performed the home defence role, although in fact most of these were also posted abroad in due course.

As a consequence, the 2/1st Black Watch Brigade was formed in January 1915 as a 2nd Line duplicate of the Black Watch Brigade. (Note: The Black Watch Brigade had an attached battalion – 5th (Renfrewshire) Battalion, Princess Louise's (Argyll and Sutherland Highlanders) – on mobilisation. The 2nd Line brigade did not include 2/5th Argyll and Sutherland Highlanders.) It was assembled at Hawick with four 2nd Line battalions of the Black Watch (Royal Highlanders) that had been raised in September 1914:

- 2/4th (City of Dundee) Battalion raised at Dundee
- 2/5th (Angus and Dundee) Battalion raised at Forfar
- 2/6th (Perthshire) Battalion raised at Perth
- 2/7th (Fife) Battalion raised at St Andrews

The brigade was assigned to Coastal Defence duties in Scottish Command. The battalions variously served at Broughty Ferry on Tay Defences (2/4th), Clyde Defences (2/5th), North Queensferry on Forth Defences (2/6th) and Kinghorn also on Forth Defences (2/7th). By June 1915, the battalions was concentrated at Bridge of Earn, Perthshire.

The brigade did not remain in existence for very much longer as the battalions were posted away. In October, the 2/4th and 2/5th Black Watch were posted to the 191st (2nd Seaforth and Cameron Highlanders) Brigade, 64th (2nd Highland) Division at Auchterarder and the 2/7th Black Watch joined the 192nd (2nd Gordon Highlanders) Brigade, 64th (2nd Highland) Division at Grangemouth. Finally, in November 1915, the 2/6th also joined the 192nd (2nd Gordon Highlanders) Brigade at Blairgowrie. With that, the brigade passed out of existence.

== See also ==
- Black Watch Brigade for the 1st Line formation
- British infantry brigades of the First World War

== Bibliography ==
- Becke, Major A.F. (1937). Order of Battle of Divisions Part 2B. The 2nd-Line Territorial Force Divisions (57th–69th) with The Home-Service Divisions (71st–73rd) and 74th and 75th Divisions. London: His Majesty's Stationery Office. ISBN 1-871167-00-0.
- James, Brigadier E.A. (1978). British Regiments 1914–18. London: Samson Books Limited. ISBN 0-906304-03-2.
- Rinaldi, Richard A (2008). Order of Battle of the British Army 1914. Ravi Rikhye. ISBN 978-0-97760728-0.
