= 9th Heavy Battery, Royal Garrison Artillery =

Artillery unit of the British Army in World War I

9th Heavy Battery, RGA
- Royal Artillery cap badge
- Active: 26 August 1914–4 August 1922
- Country: United Kingdom
- Branch: New Army
- Role: Heavy Artillery
- Size: Battery
- Part of: Royal Garrison Artillery
- Garrison/HQ: Fort Brockhurst
- Equipment: QF 4.7-inch gun BL 60-pounder gun
- Engagements: Battle of the Somme; Battle of the Lys; Third Battle of the Aisne; Battle of Amiens; Battle of Drocourt-Quéant Line; Fifth Battle of Ypres; Battle of Courtrai

Insignia
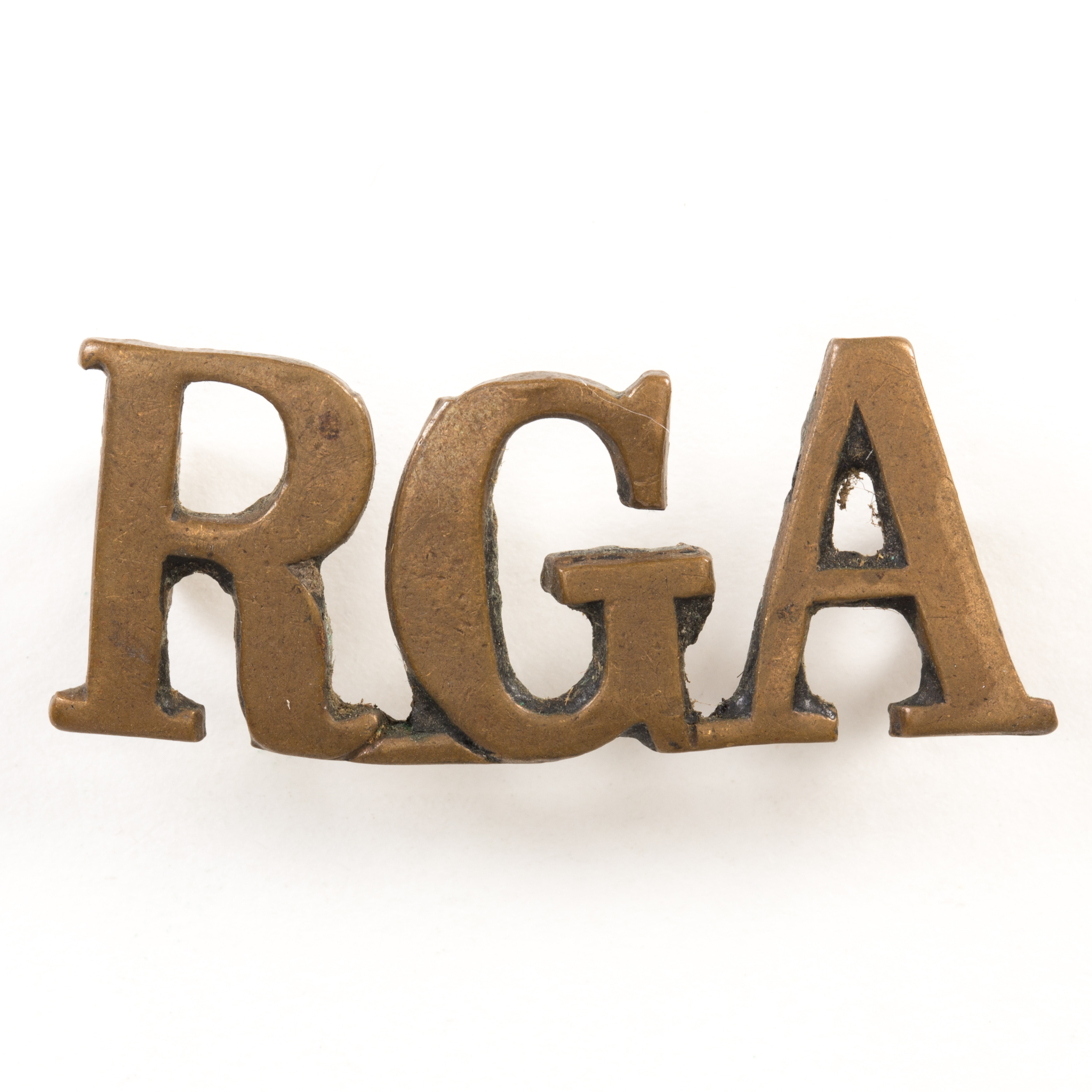
- Shoulder title

The 9th Heavy Battery, Royal Garrison Artillery, was one of the first British Army units recruited for 'Kitchener's Army' in the First World War. It served on the Western Front from 1915 to 1918, supporting different formations of the British Expeditionary Force (BEF). It was overrun and lost its guns at the Chemin des Dames in May 1918 but, re-equipped, it participated in the final Allied Hundred Days Offensive.

== Mobilisation & training ==
Alfred Leete's recruitment poster for Kitchener's Army.

On 6 August 1914, less than 48 hours after Britain's declaration of war against Germany, Parliament sanctioned an increase of 500,000 men for the Regular Army, and on 11 August the newly appointed Secretary of State for War, Earl Kitchener of Khartoum issued his famous call to arms: 'Your King and Country Need You', urging the first 100,000 volunteers to come forward. This group of six divisions with supporting arms became known as Kitchener's First New Army, or 'K1'. The establishment for each of these divisions included a heavy battery of the Royal Garrison Artillery (RGA) to be equipped with 60-pounder guns.

One of these K1 divisions, 9th (Scottish) Division composed of New Army battalions of Scottish infantry regiments, began forming in August 1914, and its heavy battery was formed at Fort Brockhurst, Gosport, on 26 August from new recruits and ex-Regular non-commissioned officers (NCOs). (Note: Pre-war Regular RGA batteries took their number from the permanent RGA Company that manned their guns – in 1914 No 9 Company RGA (formed in 1897) was stationed in Gibraltar manning the fixed defences there – but the new heavy batteries took their number from the infantry division they were raised to support. The battery's war diary initially refers to the unit as '9th Divisional Heavy Battery' and thereafter as '9th (New) Heavy Battery'; These numbers were retained after the heavy batteries were separated from their parent divisions.) The battery was initially under the command of Captain Osborn, shortly succeeded by Major Twiss. It moved to Royal Artillery Barracks, Woolwich, on 6 September, and at the end of October came under the command of Maj W.E. Castens who had been second-in-command of No 96 Company RGA on Malta when war broke out.

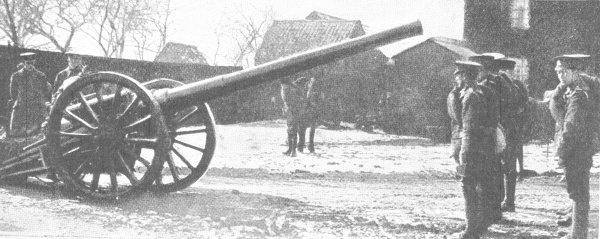
Training on a 4.7-inch gun on 'Woolwich' carriage, ca 1914.

The Kitchener units were desperately short of equipment: the battery was equipped with four 4.7-inch guns, an obsolescent pattern adopted after the Second Boer War, rather than the modern 60-pounder. On 3 December the battery moved to a tented camp at Charlton Park, Greenwich to continue its training, remaining under canvas until it moved to Odiham on 1 February 1915. During this winter it acted as a depot battery, so the officers and NCOs were constantly changing. At the end of March it moved to Bordon Camp, where the rest of 9th (Scottish) Division had assembled. Embarkation orders to join the British Expeditionary Force (BEF) in France arrived on 7 May. The battery and its ammunition column were brought up to full establishment and mobilised at Bordon on 9 May, receiving its gunsights the following day when it entrained for Southampton to embark.

== Western Front ==
=== Armentières ===
9th Heavy Battery disembarked at Le Havre on 12 May and entrained the same night for Arques. It then marched to Helfaut, arriving on 16 May. Artillery policy in the BEF was to withdraw heavy batteries from the divisions and group them into dedicated heavy artillery formations, so 9th Hvy Bty left 9th (Scottish) Division on 16 May and joined the Heavy Artillery Reserve. It was ordered up to Pont de Nieppe, near Armentières, where it established its wagon lines on 18 May and where the men were billeted in local farms. The battery took over gun positions previously occupied by the Regular 31st Hvy Bty and immediately went into action, 'A' Sub-section firing its first round on the evening of 19 May.

9th Heavy Bty formed part of an ad hoc group under Colonel Currie ('Currie's Group') along with 1/1st Warwickshire and 114th Hvy Btys. It spent the first few days registering its guns, experiencing its first 'prematures' when Shrapnel shells detonated at or near the gun. The battery then bombarded 'Fort Bismarck' assisted by aircraft observation, using outdated Lyddite high explosive (HE) shells. It also used Shrapnel shells against enemy anti-aircraft guns. and observation posts (OPs), but had to cease fire when its shells fell short because the driving bands were stripping off after leaving the barrel (a recurrent problem with the old 4.7s). In June the battery moved its guns 1 mile (1.6 km) closer to the enemy's lines at Armentières.

On 11 June the battery (together with 1/1st Warwickshire and 14th Hvy Btys) became part of the recently arrived 16th Heavy Artillery Brigade, RGA. The BEF was suffering a serious shell shortage, and 9th Hvy Bty was required to hand over most of its Lyddite ammunition for the heavy fighting elsewhere on the front. It continued firing a few rounds on most days when weather permitted, with a variety of ammunition including low explosive common pointed shell and timed or percussion shrapnel, at trenches, crossroads and bridges, enemy working parties and billets. It also conducted counter-battery (CB) fire, often in retaliation for German shelling of Armentières and Ploegsteert ('Plug Street'). The British lines were heavily shelled on 9 August while an operation was carried out in the Ypres sector. This work continued through the summer while the battery improved its positions with concrete platforms and overhead cover. In September it fired its first HE shell filled with Amatol in place of Lyddite, describing the smaller burst as 'disappointing'.

At this time 16th Bde was supporting II Corps. Although it was not directly engaged in the Battle of Loos launched on 25 September, II Corps cooperated with bombardment of the trenches in front of Fromelles and a smokescreen to deceive the enemy. 9th Heavy Bty, supporting 50th (Northumbrian) Division, was allotted 50 extra HE shells for the task, but mainly fired shrapnel, finding the smokescreen a hindrance to observation. II Corps made another demonstration on 13 October, for which 9th Hvy Bty was not required. Most ammunition was being sent to the Loos sector, so 16th Bde's batteries had a quiet time.

=== Arras ===
On 1 November 16th Bde transferred to Third Army south-west of Arras marching by way of Doullens. Right Section (RX) of 9th Hvy Bty went into prepared positions at Pommier on 6 November, while Left Section (LX) started work on new positions at Berles-au-Bois and 9th and 14th Hvy Btys shared wagon lines at Gaudiempré. 9th Heavy Bty began registering its guns next day, but firing was hampered for the rest of the year by bad weather and ammunition shortages. A little more ammunition became available at the end of December, when 9th Hvy fired battery salvoes at enemy positions that had shown the most activity. RX joined LX at Berles on 1 January 1916. However, the battery did little in early 1916: with 4.7inch ammunition being diverted to guns mounted on Merchant Navy ships, most of the firing was done by 16th Bde's 60-pdr batteries.

On 13 February 1916 9th Hvy Bty (now under the command of Maj J.N. Biggs Davison) was ordered to move out to positions near Basseux to cover a sector newly taken over by the BEF from the French. On 5 March the battery came under the command of 39th Heavy Brigade, RGA, a new HQ that had just arrived from England. The brigade's title was changed on 5 April to 39th Heavy Artillery Group (HAG) in line with a new policy that also moved batteries more frequently between the HAGs.

9th Heavy Bty participated in 39th HAG's counter-battery and retaliatory shoots. For example, it noted on 1 April: 'Carried out counter-battery work. This was reported by airmen as being a most successful shoot resulting in two tremendous explosions and a great flame of fire.' On 2 April it retaliated on the village of Ficheux: 'Our heavy guns ... fired 55 rounds in 3 minutes into the village (high explosive) 3 p.m. precisely'. However, the battery came under the command of 8th HAG from 10 May.

=== Somme ===
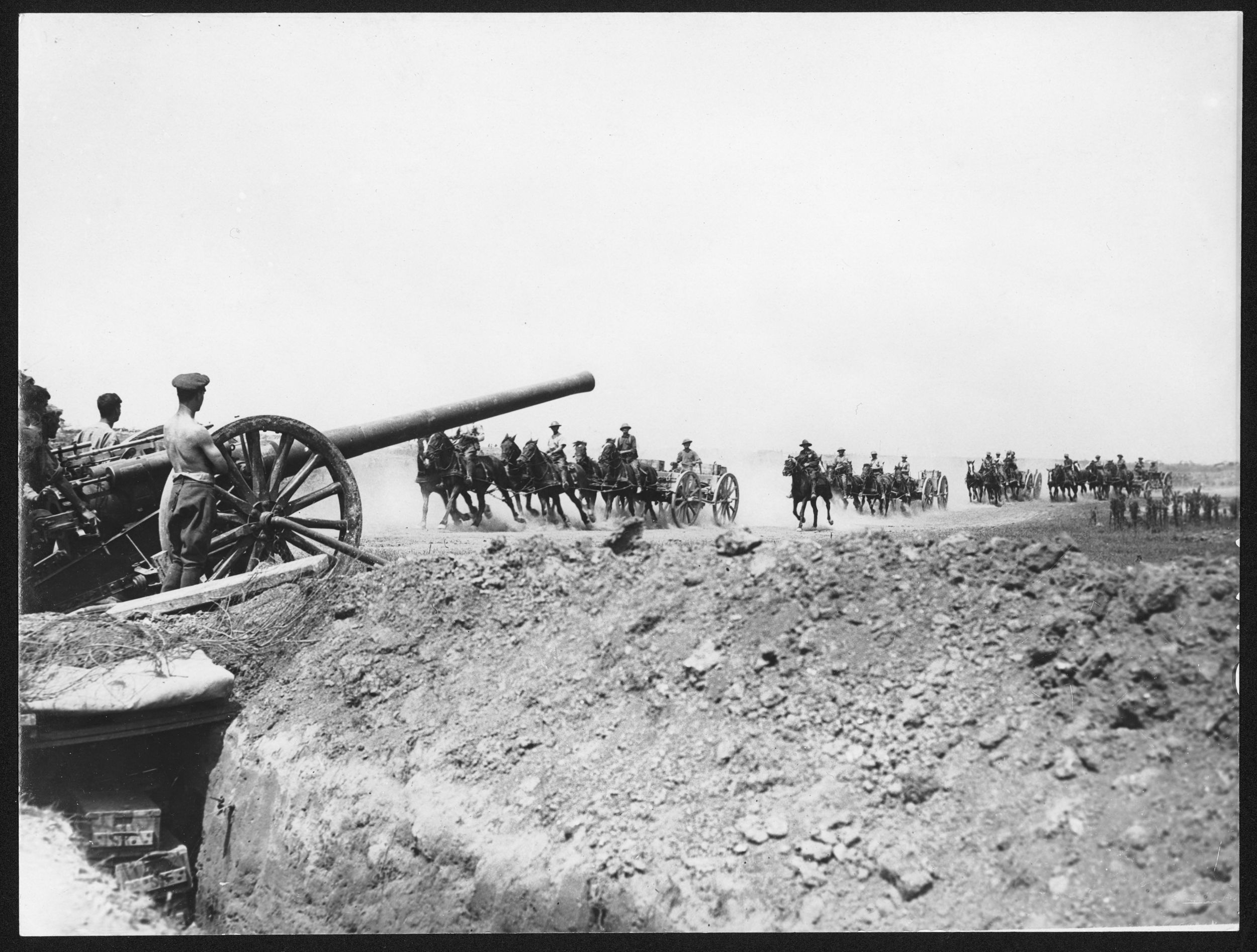
Transport limbers gallop past a battery of 4.7 inch guns on the Somme.

On the night of 9/10 June the battery moved to Anzin-Saint-Aubin just north of Arras where it came under the 'Northern Heavy Artillery Group' while 8th HAG remained south of the city as the 'Southern' group. Only the southern part of Third Army (VII Corps) was to take place in that summer's 'Big Push' (the Battle of the Somme), but the batteries with VI Corps around Arras were to cooperate, and 9th Hvy Bty was given a special allowance of 700 shells for the bombardment period from U Day (24 June) to Z Day (29 June). The battery was only to use shrapnel shell in case of emergency, because of the frequent 'prematures'. The battery also provided some personnel to 'Scott's Battery', a provisional battery formed in Northern Group to man some borrowed French guns. During the bombardment (extended by Y1 and Y2 days) the enemy batteries were unusually quiet (many had moved south), so 9th Hvy Bty had few targets and did not fire on some days. The Arras sector remained quiet while the Somme Offensive raged on, 9th Hvy Bty's gunners being mainly used to prepare positions for incoming batteries, apart from one night shoot where LX moved to fire on an enemy battery near Neuville-Vitasse, then returned to its old position before dawn. The temporary 'Northern Group' was broken up on 27 July and 9th Hvy Bty came under the command of 54th HAG, newly arrived from the UK. However, the scarcity of 4.7-inch ammunition was such that the battery did not fire at all during August.

On 13 September the battery fired off 40 rounds of shrapnel at enemy batteries and then pulled out at dusk. Next day it came 'into action' at Hébuterne, as part of a large concentration of heavy guns with VII Corps supporting the left flank of the Somme offensive. Although the battery exchanged fire with enemy batteries (one of which blew in the officers' mess dugout, luckily without causing any casualties) it could do little because of the shortage of ammunition. Much of the available ammunition was faulty, and on 26 September No 1 gun suffered a premature that blew 16 inches (41 cm) off the end of the muzzle, without casualties. On 1 October the battery was pulled out of the line and concentrated at the wagon lines at Gaudiempré, where it received a replacement for No 1 gun. It then marched to join 53rd HAG at Béthune with XI Corps of First Army on 4 October.

=== Winter 1916–17 ===
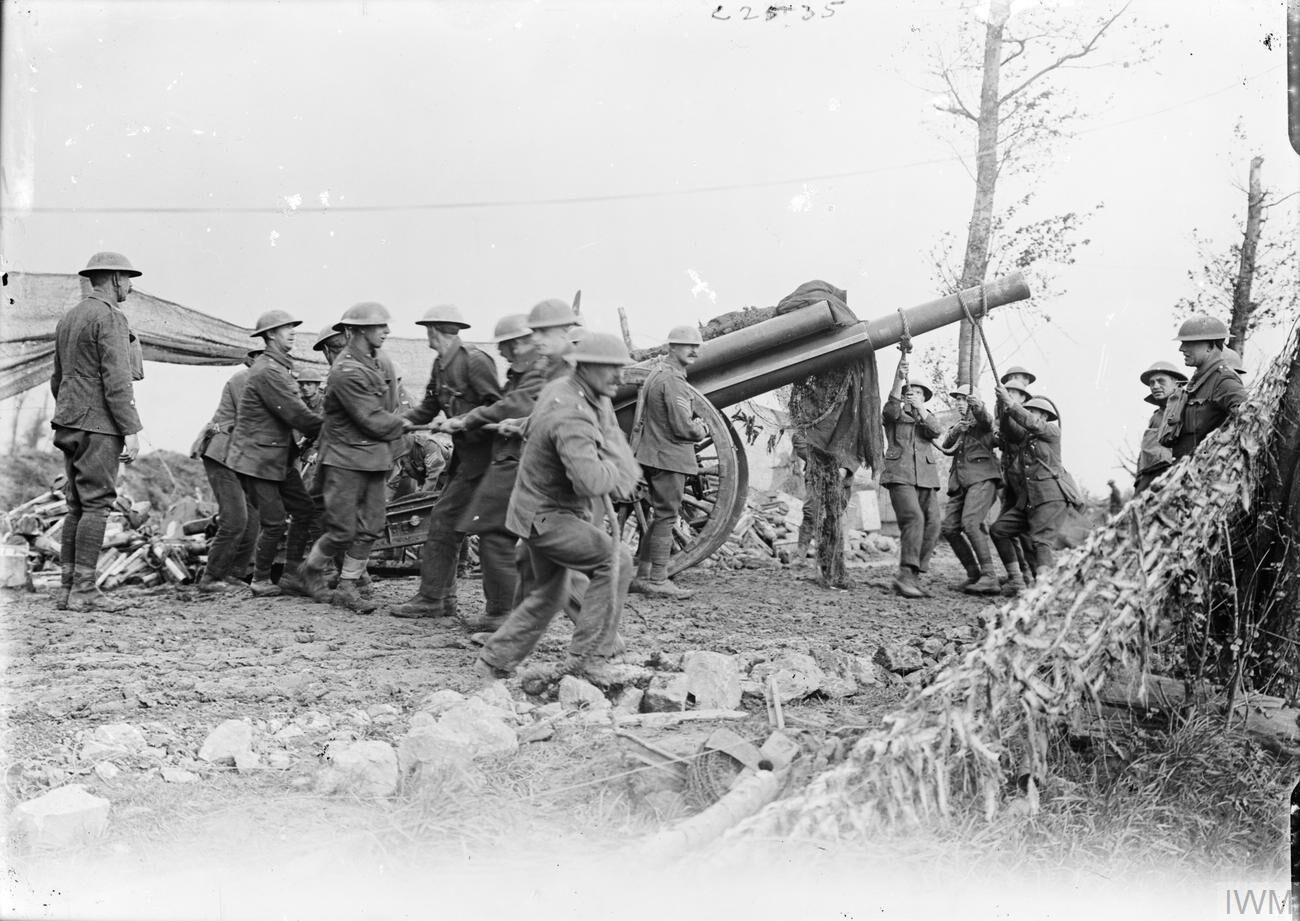
RGA gunners manhandling a 60-pounder gun, 1917.

9th Heavy Bty went into the line at Festubert but did not begin registering its guns until 15 October, when with aircraft observation it hit a German support trench and started a large fire. But the battery had little to do until 29 December when it collected four 60-pdr guns from the railhead at Béthune. The War Office had decided that all heavy batteries should be composed of six guns, and on 23 January 1917 9th Hvy Bty was joined by a section from 191st Hvy Bty, which had just arrived from England to join First Army. (191st Heavy Bty had been formed at Ewshot on 21 June; its other section was posted to 1/1st Essex Heavy Bty). The new arrivals became the battery's Centre Section (CX). The battery left 53rd HAG on 27 January for rest and to complete this reorganisation. (Note: One source suggests that the battery joined 25th HAG with Fifth Army on 11 February, but this appears to be an error, and the battery remained under First Army.)

The battery took up positions round La Couture, with RX and one gun of CX one mile south-east and LX one mile north-east (moving to Annequin in early March); C Gun of CX remained at the wagon lines for training. The battery was now well-supplied with 60-pdr ammunition. On 28 February C Gun was sent to Richebourg-Saint-Vaast where it could 'snipe' enemy trenches in enfilade with shrapnel. This gun was located by the enemy and on 30 March they fired some 200 rounds of 150 mm HE at it, slightly damaging the gun, badly damaging its carriage, blowing a limber to pieces and damaging two ammunition wagons; however there were no casualties to the gunners. D gun took over the sniping role, positioned behind Richebourg-Saint-Vaast Church, but also came under heavy fire CB on 7 April, the men's billets being destroyed. The repaired C Gun was back in action at La Couture on 10 April, but E gun at Annequin was damaged that day. During April the battery moved its guns and sections around to keep them in action. A regular target was the traffic on the La Bassée–Fournes road. The battery's OP at 'School House' in Festubert was shelled and had to be moved to 'Maison Riche' in La Plantin. A Gun fired about 100 gas shells on 14 May to neutralise a hostile battery in support of a night raid by 66th (2nd East Lancashire) Division astride the La Bassée Canal.

=== Festubert ===
In mid-May XI Corps' boundaries were changed, so RX and CX moved north to Armentières and Fleurbaix respectively, LX following at the end of the month, when it installed its guns in two dummy haystacks at Fleurbaix. The battery's wagon lines were established at Le Fort Rompu (near Erquinghem-Lys behind Armentières) from 30 May. RX drove back two enemy Kite balloon teams by firing shrapnel at 11,000 yards (10,000 m), the first time the battery had fired over Open sights. On 7 June RX assisted the neighbouring II ANZAC Corps in its attack at the Battle of Messines, but the section was forced to move several times over 7–8 June, and two drivers were killed by hostile fire. Over succeeding weeks both LX and RX were often under fire, and the 'haystacks' at Fleurbaix were set on fire on 25 June, with the guns temporarily put of out action. Although the Armentières sector was considered 'quiet', the town received heavy bombardment from the end of July and throughout August, particularly with Mustard gas, and the guns constantly had to be moved to new positions. XI Corps was not involved in the Third Ypres Offensive further north, but on the night of 8/9 November the battery supported a raid by 38th (Welsh) Division

=== Winter 1917–18 ===
On 8 December the battery was ordered north to join VIII Corps' Heavy Artillery in the newly captured Passchendaele Salient. it handed over its guns to 21st Hvy Bty and marched north to take over the guns of 1/2nd London Hvy Bty at 'Bridge House' in front of Wieltje, with the wagon lines at Vlamertinge. Here it came under 25th HAG until 22 December when 77th HAG took over 25th's batteries. Prior to joining 77th Bde, 9th Hvy Bty's casualties amounted to two drivers and one gunner killed, three officers and three other ranks (ORs) wounded. HAGs were redesignated as RGA brigades once more, and 77th (or LXXVII) Bde was defined as a 'Mixed' brigade containing heavy howitzers as well as 60-pounders. Now the batteries remained permanently with a brigade, but the brigades were switched from one army to another as required.

77th Brigade was acting as 'Northern Counter-Battery Brigade' for Fourth Army in the Ypres Salient, but on 15 January 1918 the whole brigade was taken out of the line for a month's rest, 9th Hvy Bty handing its guns back to 1/2nd London Hvy Bty. The battery spent the period at Molinghem. When it returned to the line in mid-February, it took over the guns and positions of 122nd Hvy Bty close to Warwick Farm near Potijze, with the wagon lines at Poperinge. In March Maj F.B. Hitchcock relieved Maj Biggs-Davison as OC battery. At the beginning of April the battery exchanged positions and guns with 26th Hvy Bty at 'Bank Farm'.

=== Spring Offensive ===
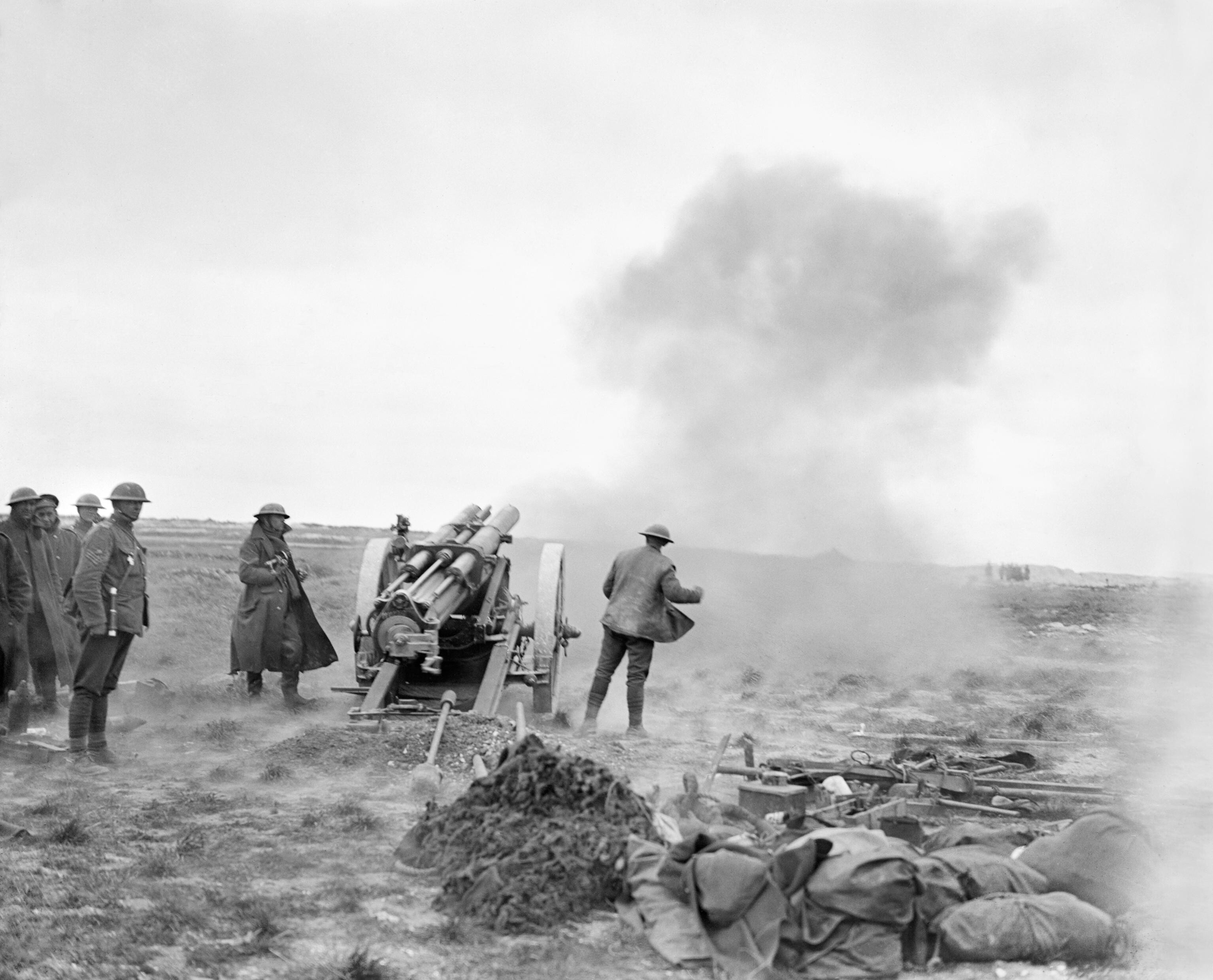
A 60-pdr Mk II gun in action in the open during the German Spring Offensive.

The German Spring Offensive had opened on 21 March 1918, but at first did not affect the Ypres Sector (now under Second Army). However, the second phase (the Battle of the Lys) struck Second Army south of Ypres on 10 April and made deep inroads into the British positions. By 14 April the decision had been made to withdraw from the dangerous Passchendaele Salient. Early next morning the battery left Bank Farm by Decauville Railway, handed over its guns to 1/2nd London Hvy Bty, which was leaving the area, and took over that battery's guns in position. These were three at 'Dead End', and two on 'Oxford Road' later moved back to 'Rome Farm'. Over the next three weeks the two guns at Rome Farm fired some 2700 rounds in support of II Corps and its neighbours on either flank. The three guns at Dead End inflicted heavy casualties on the enemy visible from the OPs but on 26 April (during the crisis of the Second Battle of Kemmel) the guns were ordered back behind Vlamertinge. In pulling out, the half-battery suffered heavy casualties, with one officer and four other ranks (ORs) killed or died of wounds, and seven others wounded. At about the same time the wagon lines were shelled and 76 horses lost.

The Battle of the Lys died down after 29 April and on 12 May 1918 77th Bde was ordered to pull out. It moved south to join IX Corps, which had been detached to a 'quiet' sector of the French Aisne front with five British divisions that had been exhausted during the earlier fighting. Made back up to six guns, 9th Hvy Bty entrained at St Omer on 18 May, arriving at Fismes station next day. It emplaced four guns at Bois de Gernicourt on 22 May, the other two being in the workshops at Fismes.

Unfortunately, IX Corps had been posted along the Chemin des Dames ridge, exactly where the next phase of the German offensive (the Third Battle of the Aisne) was aimed. German prisoners had given away the timing of the impending attack and the batteries were ordered into their gun-pits, beginning a 'counter-preparation' bombardment at midnight on 26/27 May, and putting on their gas masks before 01.00. The German bombardment – reckoned the most intense of the whole war – opened at 01.00, every battery position and HQ was smothered with gas and HE, and two of 9th Hvy Bty's gun-pits were hit within the first 10 minutes. The Germans soon broke through the weak British infantry and the battery position was surrounded, the gunners destroying the guns and escaping in small parties. Meanwhile, the wagon lines withdrew through Fismes, narrowly escaping capture, and hurriedly retired to the River Marne. When the battery collected on the south side of the river on 30 May it had suffered casualties of two officers and 38 ORs killed, wounded and prisoners. The French commander sent the remaining guns of 77th Bde to defend the Marne bridges. On 31 May the brigade withdrew to Fèrebrianges to begin refitting and 9th Hvy Bty received two replacement guns. As the fighting continued there were repeated alerts, and on 9 June the brigade was rapidly moved back another 17 miles (27 km).

=== Hundred Days Offensive ===
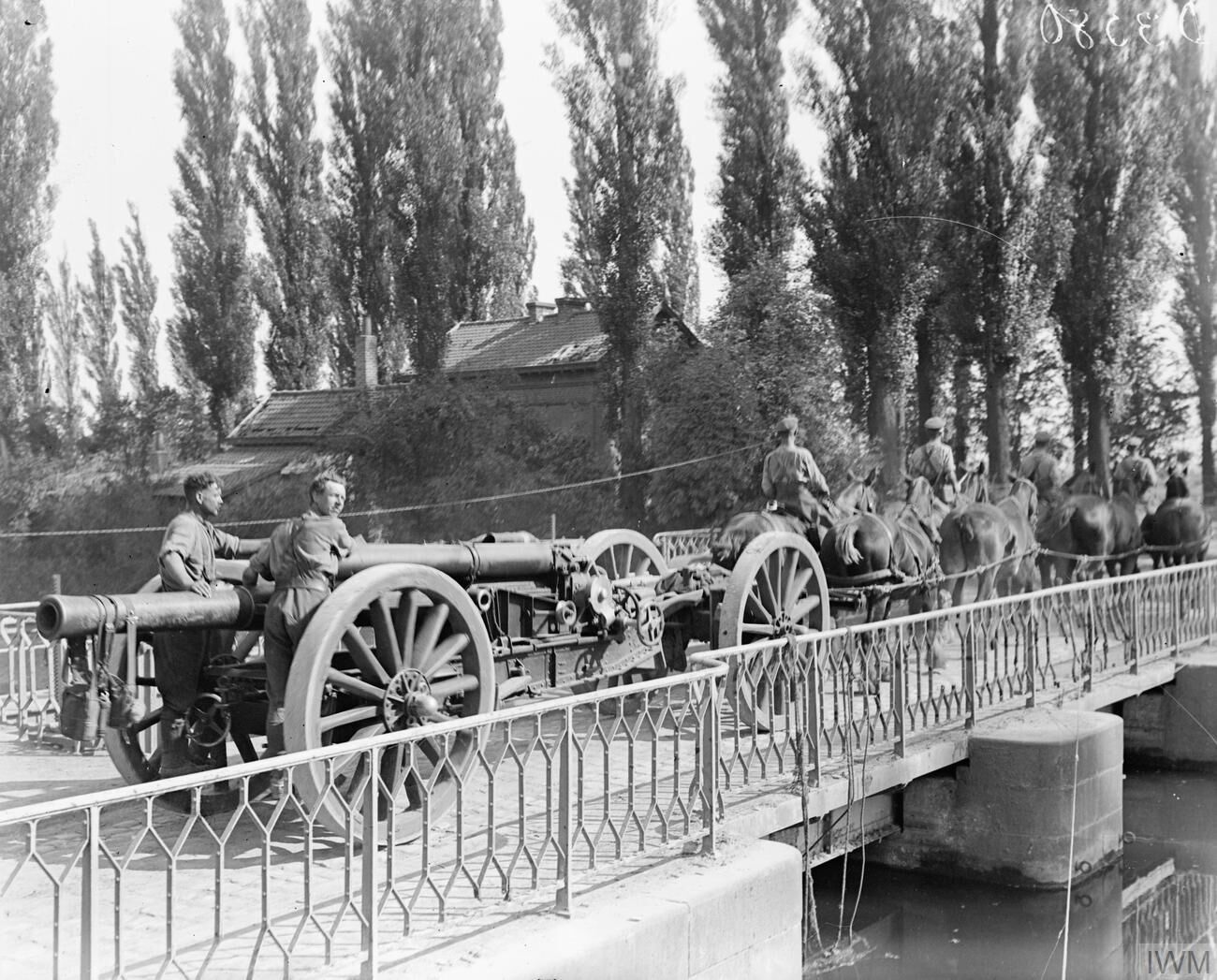
A 60-pounder gun being moved up in 1918.

77th Brigade moved to Saudoy on 12 July, where 9th Hvy Bty was brought up to a strength of six guns once more. During the month Capt D. Rhodes was promoted to take over command of the battery. The brigade was in GHQ Reserve at this time, but was moved around several times, the gunners preparing new gun positions that were not actually occupied, in order to mislead the enemy as to the direction of the coming Allied counter-offensive. On 3 August it entrained at St Omer for Ailly-sur-Somme and then marched to Daours, where 9th Hvy Bty established its wagon lines. The guns were positioned at Hamelet on 5 August in time to support the Australian Corps for the Battle of Amiens on 8 August, which opened the Allied offensive. There was no registration or preliminary bombardment and the barrage came down as a surprise at H Hour (04.20); the Australians were on their first objectives 2 miles (3.2 km) away by 07.00. 9th Heavy Bty fired 1800 rounds in six hours, unregistered but 'by the map' from its carefully surveyed battery positions. It then followed up the advance in the afternoon, with RX and LX moving to a position in a valley between Cerisy-Gailly and Lamotte-Warfusée. From this position the guns carried out CB and harassing fire tasks supporting the continuation of the advance. CX followed up on 10 August, but next day the battery was pulled back to Daours.

When 9th Hvy Bty went back into the line on 13 August it occupied a 'silent' position west of Lihons, but although the battery was not firing, the position was under direct observation by the enemy and was continually shelled with HE and gas, the battery suffering a number of casualties. Eventually, on 27 August, 77th Bde was ordered to leave the corps and the guns were pulled back to Hamelet. On 30 August 9th Hvy Bty entrained for the Arras sector. Right and Centre Sections on the first train completed detraining at Écurie just after midnight, and came into action at Guémappe, 13 miles (21 km) away, at 05.00, just as the Canadian Corps was launched to capture the 'crow's Nest' as a jumping off point for its next attack. By noon RX moved forward into captured territory ahead of any other heavy artillery and most of the field artillery. The other sections moved up next day, as the Canadians broke through the Drocourt-Quéant Switch Line. The enemy then withdrew a distance, so the battery moved to a position between Cagnicourt and Villers-lès-Cagnicourt. However, it was again under constant fire from HE and gas, and bombed by aircraft several times. On the night of 5/6 September two guns were temporarily put out of action and a number of casualties sustained. A further advance was planned, but the enemy retired and 77th Bde took no further part other than a sharp bombardment of a trench system to assist the French, carried out after the batteries had already been ordered to move.

77th Brigade was now switched again, this time to II Corps in Second Army on 17 September to prepare for the Fifth Battle of Ypres. The batteries reached the area by train on 19 September and 9th Hvy Bty's guns were pulled into position near 'Salvation Corner' at Ypres. However, there was no preliminary bombardment or pre-registration, and the incoming batteries remained silent before Z day, 9th Hvy Bty's gunners being billeted behind the lines at Hospital Farm, Vlamertinge. On the night of 27/28 September they went to their gun positions and opened fire at 02.30, doing CB fire by map until 09.30, when the battery participated in a Creeping barrage to cover the advance of 29th Division either side of the Menin Road to Gheluvelt. The infantry advance was very rapid, and that afternoon RX followed by CX and LX in turn moved up to a position beside Zillebeke Lake, opening fire again at 22.00. By now the Germans had retired so far that almost all the heavy artillery was out of range and could not advance over the devatasted country; 9th Hvy Bty was one of the few able to fire on 29 September, when it supported 29th Division's further advance.

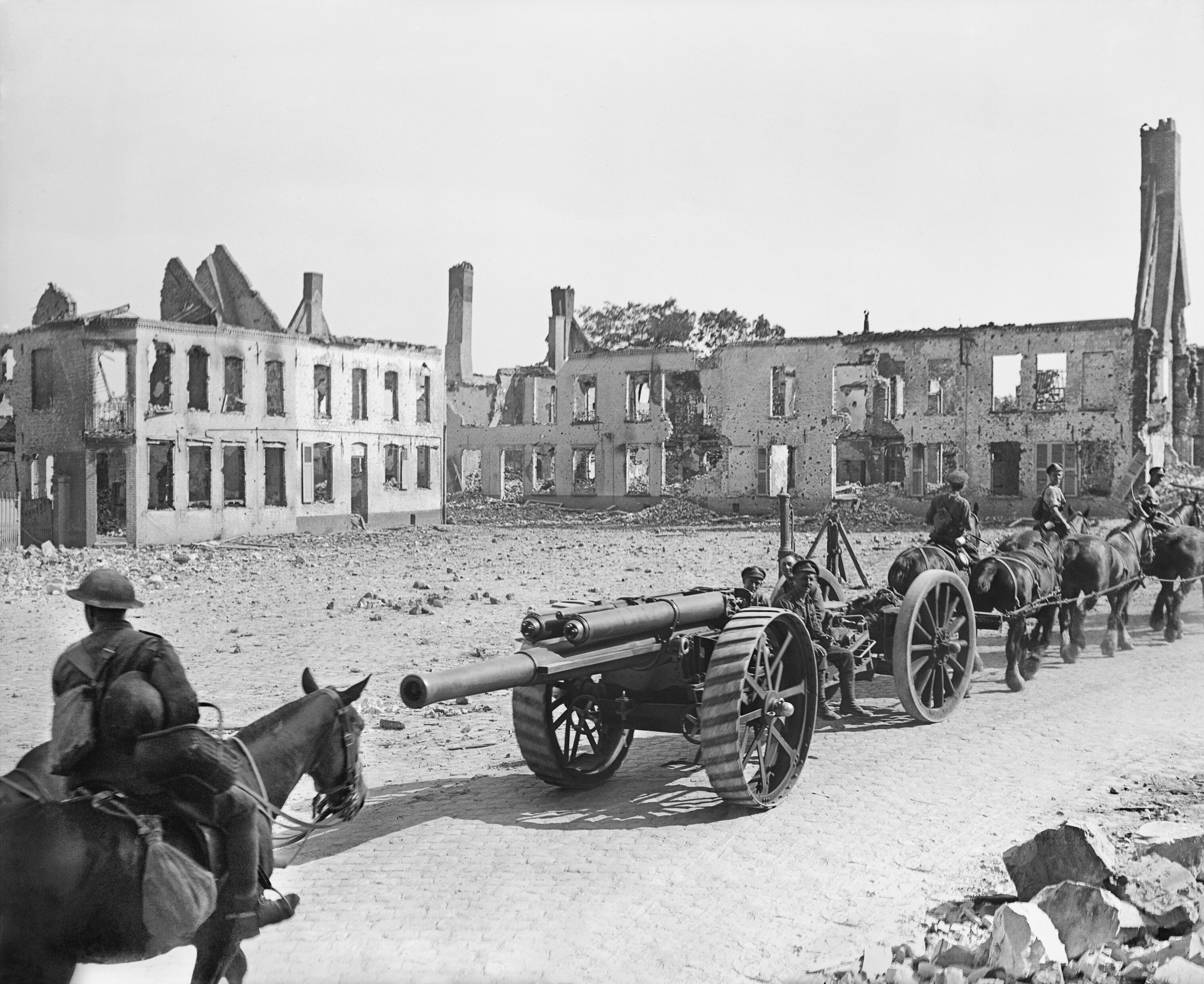
A 60-pounder advancing through a ruined town during the Hundred Days Offensive, 1918.

The roads were repaired by 4 October, and 77th Bde sent forward its 60-pdr batteries, 9th and 26th. 9th Heavy Bty took up a silent position at Terhand, next day detaching two guns to carry out harassing fire from a position half a mile further forward. These two guns remained in action until 13 October when they rejoined the battery for the next day's operation (the Battle of Courtrai). Once again the battery supported 29th Division. Zero hour was at 05.35; LX pulled out at 10.00 ready to advance, and in the afternoon it was east of Ledegem supporting 29th Division's follow-up attack next day. During this advance on 15 October RX and CX leapfrogged past LX, going into action beyond Gullegem. On 17 October it moved into positions north of Heule and supported Second Army's crossing of the River Lys at Courtrai on 20 October. The battery (less one worn-out gun) then closed up to the river, waiting for it to be bridged.

The engineers completed a heavy bridge at Cuerne on 22 October and 9th Hvy Bty crossed that morning, going into action at Esscher to support 9th (Scottish) Division as it advanced towards the Scheldt. By now the 60-pdr and 6-inch howitzer batteries had outrun the rest of 77th Bde with their heavy howitzers. LX moved up to Ingoyghem on 26 October, when it suffered the battery's last battle casualty of the war, while the three guns of CX and RX moved up to east of St Louis on 28 October, to be joined by LX next day. On 31 October, when all the batteries had come up, 9th Hvy Bty supported 31st Division's advance to the banks of the Scheldt, then in the afternoon moved up to a position between Ingoyghem and Anseghem. This was the last position from which the battery fired. It was withdrawn to the wagon lines at Esscher on 3 November, and although it took up positions again near Heestert on 8 November, the enemy was retreating so quickly that the operation was cancelled. Hostilities ended when the Armistice with Germany came into force on 11 November.

== Postwar ==
After the Armistice, 77th Bde went into billets in the Tournai area, moving to the Brussels area with II Corps on 15 December, when 9th Hvy Bty went to Caëstre. Over the winter many of the men were demobilised. It was decided in February 1919 that the battery would remain in the postwar Regular Army as 9th Bty, RGA. On 21 March a draft of 52 ORs left to join 41st Bde with British Army of the Rhine. The remaining cadre of 2 officers and 52 ORs with the battery's equipment embarked at Dunkirk for Southampton on 31 March, arriving at the RGA camp at Lydd on 2 April. Here it reformed as 9th Bty in III Bde, RGA. On 7 August 1920 they were redesignated as 9th Medium Bty and 3rd Medium Bde. However, on 21 May 1922 the battery was absorbed by 10th Medium Bty (the former 10th Siege Bty) in the same brigade.
