= Herman Landon =

British Army general (1859–1948)

Major-General Herman Landon CB CMG
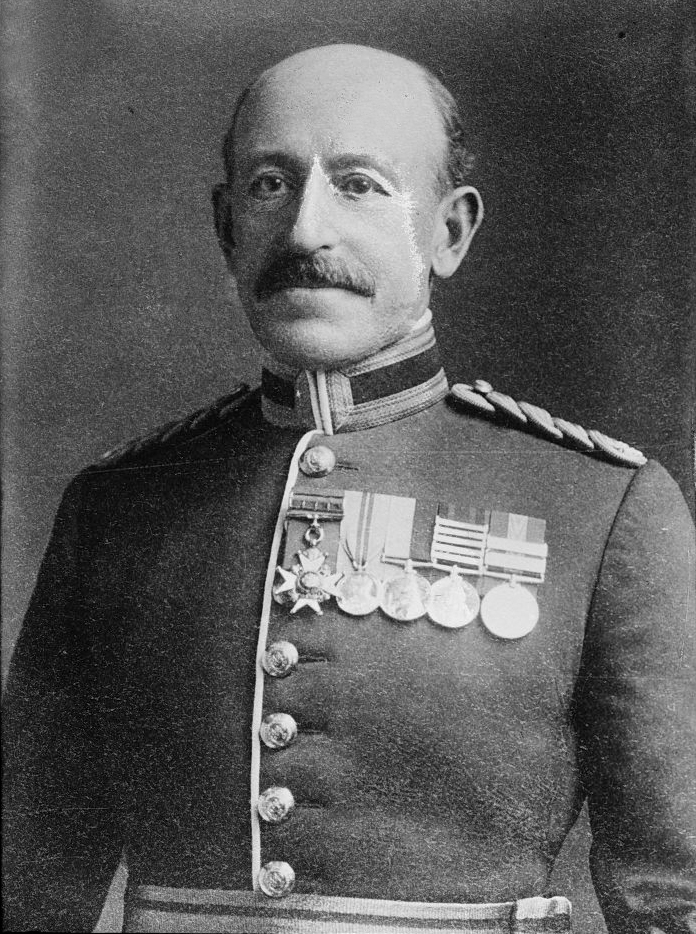
- Landon in c. 1911–14
- Born: 23 August 1859
- Died: 16 October 1948 (aged 89); Scottow, Norfolk
- Military career
- Allegiance: United Kingdom
- Branch: British Army
- Service years: 1879–1918
- Rank: Major-General
- Units: 6th Regiment of Foot; Royal Warwickshire Regiment
- Commands: 64th Division; 35th Division; 33rd Division; 9th (Scottish) Division; 1st Division; 3rd Brigade; 1st Battalion, Royal Warwickshire Regiment; 2nd Battalion, Royal Warwickshire Regiment
- Conflicts: Mahdist War; Second Boer War; First World War
- Awards: Companion of the Order of the Bath; Companion of the Order of St Michael and St George; Mentioned in Despatches (5); Croix de Guerre; Commander of the Order of Leopold (Belgium)

Major-General Herman James Shelley Landon, CB, CMG (23 August 1859 – 16 October 1948) was a British Army officer. He commanded a battalion during the Second Boer War, and was promoted in the interwar period to take command of a brigade in the British Expeditionary Force following the outbreak of the First World War. He commanded the brigade during the early fighting on the Western Front, and succeeded to the command of the 1st Infantry Division when his commanding general was killed at the First Battle of Ypres; he later commanded four more New Army divisions during the war.

== Early life ==
Herman Landon was born on 23 August 1859, the son of Mary Maria née Edgar (1829–1912) (Note: The widow of Henry Francis Leigh (1820–1853), son of Augusta Maria Leigh née Byron (1783–1851) and Lt-Col George Leigh (1771–1845)) and James Landon (1807–1879); he had one elder sister, Letitia Elizabeth Landon (1845–1915), and an older stepsister, Geraldine Amelia Leigh (1845–1940) (Note: Supposedly the model for Gwendolen in George Eliot's Daniel Deronda.). The family was comfortably well off, living in the respectable area of Paddington, London.

James Landon was an Indian cotton merchant; though predominantly involved in growing rather than processing, he had been responsible for setting up one of the first successful cotton mills in India, at Bharuch in Gujarat, in 1854. Later in the decade he advised Ranchhodlal Chhotalal on the development of a similar mill in Ahmedabad. He died in March 1879, leaving a substantial estate of eight to nine thousand pounds.

== Early military career ==
Herman Landon was educated at Harrow from 1874 to 1876, leaving just before his seventeenth birthday. He later attended the Royal Military College, Sandhurst, passing out in January 1879 in the same class as Thomas Snow, later a lieutenant general, Charles Irwin Fry, later a major general in the Indian Army, along with Henry Huntly Leith Malcolm, Herbert Henry Burney, and James Redmond Patrick Gordon, all three of whom who later rose to the rank of brigadier general. He took his commission in the 6th Regiment of Foot (later the Royal Warwickshire Regiment) of the British Army.

He was promoted to lieutenant in April 1881, although his seniority was backdated to 12 February, and captain on 11 February 1887, seniority dating back to 29 November 1886.

Promoted in December 1897 to major, he served in the Sudan in 1898, where he saw action at the Battle of Atbara and the Battle of Omdurman, and was mentioned in dispatches.

He returned to Africa in 1900, in the Second Boer War, where he took temporary command of his battalion, the 2nd Royal Warwickshire Regiment (which the 6th Regiment of Foot, into which he had been commissioned, became in 1881), from March to November. For this service, he was again mentioned in despatches, as well as being given a brevet promotion to lieutenant colonel.

== Continued career ==
He then was sent to British India, where he joined the 1st Battalion, Royal Warwicks, and on 24 February 1902 was promoted to substantive lieutenant colonel and given command of the battalion. He was promoted to brevet colonel in July 1904 and, after four years in command of the battalion, relinquished command on 24 February 1906 and was placed on half-pay. In October was appointed as an inspector of gymnasia in India. In February 1907, he was promoted substantive colonel.

He returned to an active command in August 1910, when he was made a temporary brigadier general and given command of the 3rd Infantry Brigade, in succession to Major General Frederick Hammersley. He was appointed a Companion of the Order of the Bath in the 1911 Coronation Honours.

== First World War ==
The 3rd Brigade, part of 1st Infantry Division, mobilised with the British Expeditionary Force (BEF) on the outbreak of the First World War, and was sent to France. Landon commanded it during the Retreat from Mons, the Battle of the Marne and the Battle of the Aisne, and was promoted to major-general, "for distinguished service in the field", in October.

During the First Battle of Ypres, which began in October, the divisional commander, Major-General Samuel Lomax, was severely wounded in action (and later died of his injuries in April 1915), and Landon took command. By the end of the battle in November, however, he himself was invalided home, and was relieved as divisional commander by Major General Sir David Henderson. Landon was formally replaced in command of his brigade by Lieutenant Colonel Richard Butler on 13 November.

On his recovery in December, he was appointed inspector of infantry, and early in 1915 was appointed to command the 9th (Scottish) Division of the New Army. He accompanied it to France, but was replaced in September due to ill health, shortly before the division saw combat, and sustained heavy losses, at the Battle of Loos.

In October he took command of the New Army's 33rd Division, this time remaining with the division when it went into combat at the Battle of the Somme in July 1916. In September he exchanged commands with Major General Reginald Pinney and was appointed to command the 35th Division, remaining with it until July 1917, when his health forced him to retire from active service.

From August 1917 to March 1918 he commanded the 64th Division in the Home Forces, before finally retiring from the army on 19 August 1919.

During the war, he was mentioned in dispatches three more times. After the war, he was appointed a Companion of the Order of St Michael and St George (CMG). He also received the French Croix de Guerre, and was appointed a Commander of the Belgian Order of Leopold.

== Family ==
Landon married Christian Ethel Sharp (1876–1957) in 1903, and they had one daughter, Mary Christian Landon (1904–1968).

Landon died at the age of 89 in October 1948 at the family home in Scottow, Norfolk.

== Sources ==
Military offices
Preceded by Samuel Lomax	General Officer Commanding 1st Division (acting); 31 October – 22 November 1914	Succeeded by David Henderson
Preceded by Charles Fergusson	General Officer Commanding 9th (Scottish) Division; January–September 1915	Succeeded by George Thesiger
Preceded by George Thesiger	General Officer Commanding 33rd Division; 1915–1916	Succeeded by Reginald Pinney
Preceded by Reginald Pinney	General Officer Commanding 35th Division; 1916–1917	Succeeded by George Franks
Preceded by Richard Bannatine-Allason	General Officer Commanding 64th Division; 1917–1918	Succeeded by Henry Lukin
