= 9th (Scottish) Division =

Infantry division of the British Army during the First World War

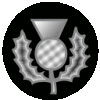
- Active: 21 August 1914 – 16 March 1919
- Country: United Kingdom
- Branch: British Army
- Type: Infantry
- Size: Division
- Engagements: First World War Battle of Loos Battle of the Somme Capture of Longueval Battle of Le Transloy Battle of Arras (1917) Battle of Passchendaele Ludendorff Offensive Battle of Messines Battle of Bailleul Battle of Kemmel Ridge Battle of Scherpenberg Battle of the Lys Salient Fourth Battle of Ypres Battle of Courtrai Battle of Ooteghem

The 9th (Scottish) Division was an infantry division of the British Army during the First World War, one of the Kitchener's Army divisions raised from volunteers by Lord Kitchener to serve on the Western Front during the First World War.

After the 1st South African Infantry Brigade Group joined in early 1916, the division was known colloquially as the Jock and Springboks.

== History ==
=== Background ===
A 9th Division had been formed for service during the Second Boer War, and was commanded by Henry Edward Colvile. In 1902, a 9th Division was as formed and was commanded by Edward Pemberton Leach, but it was broken-up at some point prior to the start of the war.

=== First World War ===
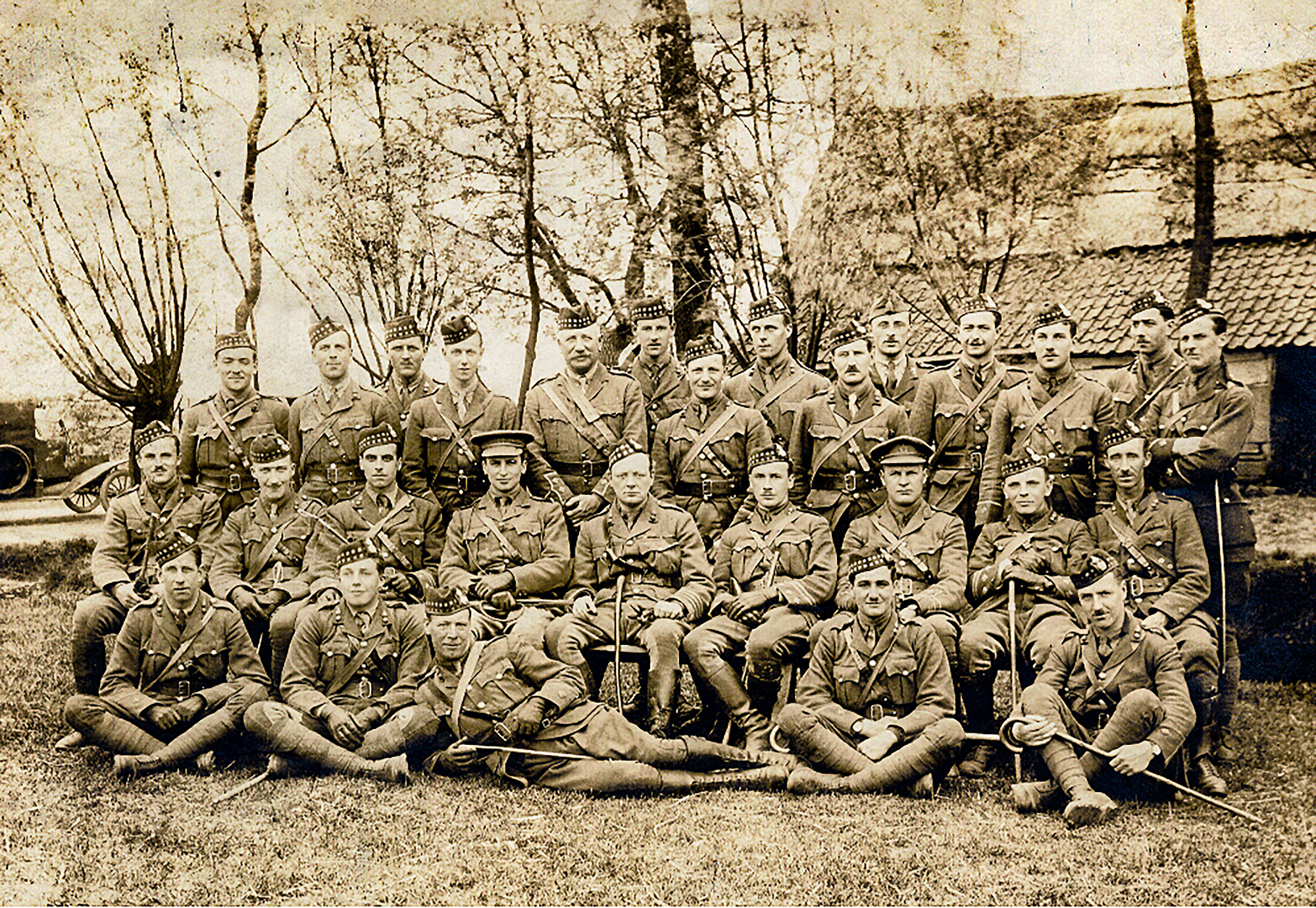
Winston Churchill and fellow officers of the 6th (Service) Battalion, Royal Scots Fusiliers, in 1916 at Ploegsteert, Belgium.

In the Battle of Loos, notable for being the first battle in which British forces used poison gas, the 9th (Scottish) Division assaulted the Hohenzollern Redoubt, the 5th Camerons suffered horrific casualties, and Corporal James Dalgleish Pollock gained a Victoria Cross for his actions.

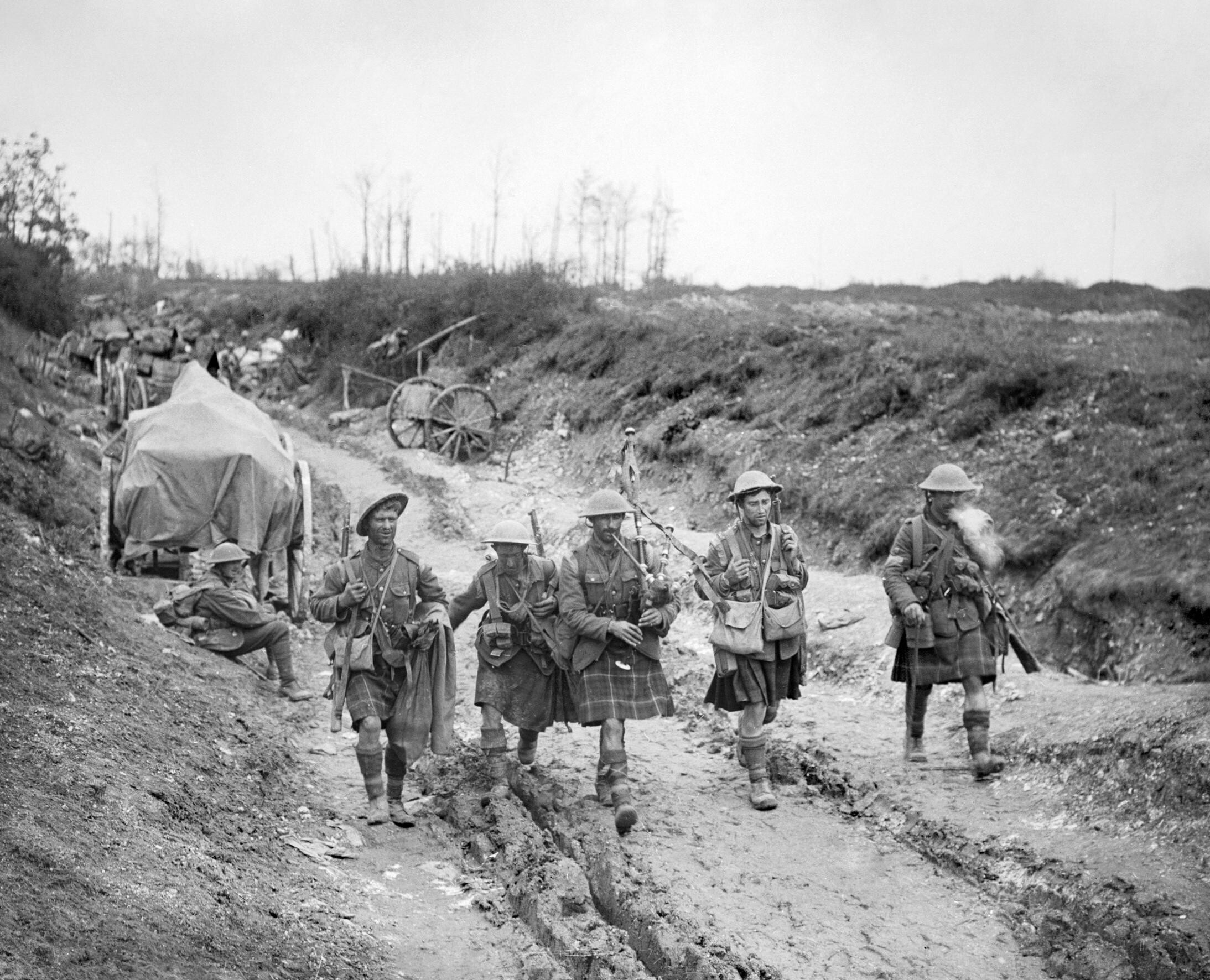
A piper of the 7th (Service) Battalion, Seaforth Highlanders leads four men of the 26th Brigade back from the trenches after the attack on Longueval, France, July 1916.

The 9th (Scottish) Division took part in major fighting during the Somme offensive. Notably it relieved the 30th Division at Montauban and later attacked German positions at Bernafay Wood, where it succeeded in capturing vital objectives and forcing a German withdrawal. In the Somme offensive, the 9th (Scottish) Division liberated the village of Longueval; the village now has a statue of a Scottish piper at its crossroads that commemorates this fact (see Caterpillar Valley Cemetery) and also other pipers who served in the First World War.

== Order of battle ==
The division comprised the following brigades:

26th Brigade

- 8th (Service) Battalion, Black Watch (Royal Highlanders)
- 7th (Service) Battalion, Seaforth Highlanders (Ross-shire Buffs, Duke of Albany's)
- 8th (Service) Battalion, Gordon Highlanders (transferred to 15th (Scottish) Division 7 May 1916)
- 5th (Service) Battalion, Queen's Own Cameron Highlanders
- 1/5th Battalion, Loyal North Lancashire Regiment, Territorial Force (TF) (joined December 1915 left January 1916)
- 10th (Service) Battalion, Argyll and Sutherland Highlanders (transferred from 27th Brigade 6 May 1916, transferred to 32nd Division 17 February 1918)
- 26th Machine Gun Company (formed 29 January 1916 left to move into 9th Battalion Machine Gun Corps (M.G.C.) 1 March 1918)
- 26th Trench Mortar Battery (joined 15 June 1916)

27th Brigade

- 11th (Service) Battalion, Royal Scots (Lothian Regiment)
- 12th (Service) Battalion, Royal Scots (Lothian Regiment)
- 6th (Service) Battalion, Royal Scots Fusiliers (transferred to 15th (Scottish) Division 7 May 1916)
- 10th (Service) Battalion, Argyll and Sutherland Highlanders (transferred to 26th Brigade 7 May 1916)
- 6th (Service) Battalion, King's Own Scottish Borderers (transferred from 28th Brigade 6 May 1916)
- 9th (Service) Battalion, Cameronians (Scottish Rifles) (transferred from 28th Brigade 6 May 1916, transferred to the 14th (Light) Division in February 1918)
- 27th Machine Gun Company (formed 23 December 1915, left to move into 9th Battalion M.G. C. 1 March 1918)
- 27th Trench Mortar Battery (joined July 1916)

28th Brigade

(The 28th Brigade was broken up in May 1916 and replaced with the 1st South African Brigade. It reformed in September 1918)

- 6th (Service) Battalion, King's Own Scottish Borderers (transferred to 27th Brigade 6 May 1916)
- 9th (Service) Battalion, Cameronians (Scottish Rifles) (transferred to 27th Brigade 6 May 1916, returned September 1918)
- 10th (Service) Battalion, Highland Light Infantry (transferred to South African Brigade 6 May 1916)
- 11th (Service) Battalion, Highland Light Infantry (transferred to South African Brigade 6 May 1916)
- 2nd Battalion, Royal Scots Fusiliers (transferred from South African Brigade 13 September 1918)
- 1st Battalion, Royal Newfoundland Regiment (joined September 1918)
- 28th Machine Gun Company (formed 3 January 1916 transferred to South African Brigade 6 May 1916)
- 28th Trench Mortar Battery(joined 11 September 1918)

1st South African Brigade

(Replaced the 28th Brigade in May 1916 and was replaced in turn by a reformed 28th Brigade on 13 September 1918)

- 1st Regiment, South African Infantry (merged with 2nd and 4th Battalions on 24 April 1918 as the South African (Composite) Regiment, regained separate identity on 1 September 1918)
- 2nd Regiment, South African Infantry (merged with 1st Battalion, reformed 1 September 1918)
- 3rd Regiment, South African Infantry (disbanded 18 February 1918)
- 4th Regiment, South African Infantry (merged with 1st Battalion, reformed 1 September 1918)
- 10th (Service) Battalion, Highland Light Infantry (transferred from 28th Brigade 6 May 1916, merged with 11th Battalion on 14 May 1916 forming 10/11th Battalion and transferred to 15th (Scottish) Division)
- 11th (Service) Battalion, Highland Light Infantry (transferred from 28th Brigade 6 May 1916 merged with 10th Battalion)
- 3/4th Battalion, Royal West Kent Regiment, TF (joined 6 June 1917, left 15 June 1917)
- 3/10th Battalion, Middlesex Regiment, TF (joined 6 June 1917, left 23 July 1917)
- 2nd Battalion, Royal Scots Fusiliers (joined 26 April 1918, transferred to 28th Brigade 13 September 1918)
- 9th (Service) Battalion, Cameronians (Scottish Rifles) (joined 21 April 1918, transferred to 28th Brigade 12 September 1918)
- 28th Machine Gun Company (transferred from 28th Brigade 6 May 1916 left to move into 9th Battalion M.G.C. 1 March 1918)
- South African Trench Mortar Battery (joined 13 June 1916)

Divisional Troops

- 6th (Service) Battalion, Bedfordshire Regiment (left March 1915)
- 6th (Service) Battalion, Leicestershire Regiment (left April 1915)
- 9th (Service) Battalion, Seaforth Highlanders (joined December 1914, became Divisional Pioneer Battalion early 1915)
- 10th Motor Machine Gun Battery (joined 30 April 1915, left 11 June 1916)
- 197th Company, M.G.C. (joined 19 December 1916, left to move into 9th Battalion M.G.C. 1 March 1918)
- 9th Battalion, M.G.C. (formed 1 March 1918 absorbing the brigade MG companies)
- 11th Motor Machine Gun Battery (joined 7 October 1918, left 7 November 1918)
- Divisional Mounted Troops
  - B Squadron, 1/1st Glasgow Yeomanry (joined 15 May 1915, left 10 May 1916)
  - 9th Divisional Cyclist Company, Army Cyclist Corps (formed 1 December 1914, left 26 June 1916)
- 9th Divisional Train Army Service Corps
  - 104th, 105th, 106th and 107th Companies
- 21st Mobile Veterinary Section Army Veterinary Corps
- 212th Divisional Employment Company (formed by 23 June 1917)

Royal Artillery

- L Brigade, Royal Field Artillery (R.F.A.)
- LI Brigade, R.F.A.
- LII Brigade, R.F.A. (left 8 January 1917)
- LIII (Howitzer) Brigade, R.F.A. (broken up 11 September 1916)
- 9th Divisional Ammunition Column R.F.A.
- 9th Heavy Battery, Royal Garrison Artillery (left 16 May 1915)
- V.9 Heavy Trench Mortar Battery R.F.A. (joined May 1916, left February 1918)
- X.9, Y.9 and Z.9 Medium Mortar Batteries R.F.A. (joined April 1916; on 13 February 1918, Z broken up and distributed among X and Y batteries)

Royal Engineers

- 63rd Field Company
- 64th Field Company
- 90th Field Company (joined January 1915)
- 9th Divisional Signals Company

Royal Army Medical Corps

- 27th Field Ambulance
- 28th Field Ambulance
- 29th Field Ambulance (left May 1916)
- South African Field Ambulance (joined May 1916, left 13 September 1918)
- 2/1st (East Lancashire) Field Ambulance (joined 26 September 1918)
- 20th Sanitary Section (left 29 March 1917)

== General Officers Commanding ==
Commanders have included:

- 27 August – 11 October 1914 Major-General Colin Mackenzie
- 11 October – 26 October 1914 Brigadier-General Spencer Scrase-Dickens (acting)
- 26 October – 31 December 1914 Lieutenant-General Sir Charles Fergusson
- 31 December 1914 – 21 January 1915 Brigadier-General Spencer Scrase-Dickens (acting)
- 21 January – 8 September 1915 Major-General Herman Landon
- 9 September – 27 September 1915 Major-General George Thesiger
- 27 September 1915 Major-General Edward Bulfin (temporary)
- 28 September 1915 – 2 December 1916 Major-General William Furse
- 2 December 1916 – 4 March 1918 Major-General Henry Lukin
- 4 March – 13 March 1918 Brigadier-General Henry Hugh Tudor (acting)
- 13 March – 16 March 1918 Major-General Cyril Blacklock
- 16 March – 24 March 1918 Brigadier-General Henry Hugh Tudor (acting)
- 24 March – 28 March 1918 Major-General Cyril Blacklock
- 28 March 1918 – 1919 Major-General Henry Hugh Tudor

== See also ==
- List of British divisions in World War I
- British 9th (Highland) Infantry Division (for World War II)
