= George Thesiger =

British Army general

Major-General George Thesiger CB CMG
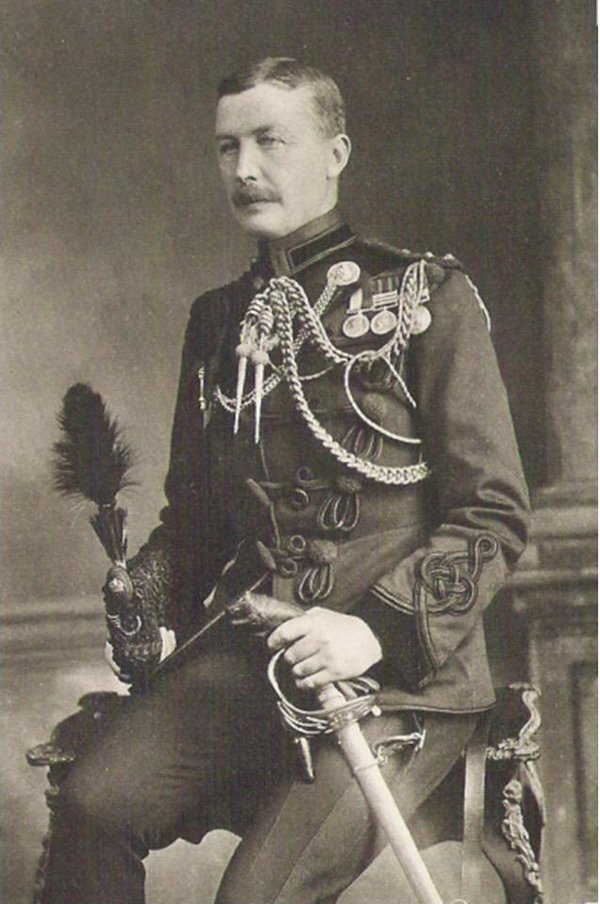
- Born: 6 October 1868; Islington, London, England
- Died: 27 September 1915 (aged 46); Hohenzollern Redoubt, Loos, France
- Military career
- Allegiance: United Kingdom
- Branch: British Army
- Service years: 1890–1915
- Rank: Major-General
- Units: Rifle Brigade; King's African Rifles
- Commands: 9th (Scottish) Infantry Division; 33rd Division; 2nd Infantry Brigade; 4th Battalion, Rifle Brigade (The Prince Consort's Own)
- Conflicts: Nile Expedition; Second Boer War; First World War
- Awards: Companion of the Order of the Bath; Companion of Order of St Michael and St George; Mentioned in Despatches

Major-General George Handcock Thesiger, CB, CMG (6 October 1868 – 27 September 1915) was a senior officer in the British Army during the First World War who was killed in action during the Battle of Loos by German shellfire. His career encompassed military service in Egypt, South Africa, Ireland, British India and France.

== Early life ==
Thesiger was born on 6 October 1868 into the Thesiger family, the son of Lieutenant General Charles Wemyss Thesiger and Charlotte Elizabeth Handcock. He was the middle of three children, with one older sister, Ethel Mary, and one younger brother, Gerald. He was the grandson of the politician Frederic Thesiger, 1st Baron Chelmsford and nephew of Major General Frederic Thesiger and the judge Alfred Henry Thesiger.

== Early military career ==
Thesiger was educated at Eton College before attending the Royal Military College, Sandhurst for training as an infantry officer. Aged 21, Thesiger was gazetted into the Rifle Brigade as a second lieutenant on 19 March 1890, and served with his unit in England until 1898, when the regiment was dispatched to Egypt. During his service in England he was promoted to lieutenant on 10 February 1892, and to captain on 28 July 1897, later antedated to 26 July. In Egypt, the Rifle Brigade served on the Nile expedition under Horatio Kitchener during the Mahdist War and was present at the Battle of Omdurman, which decided the campaign. Thesiger received a brevet appointment as major on 16 November 1898 for his service.

The Rifle Brigade was then briefly stationed in Crete during operations to maintain peace between Turkish and Greek populations on the island. In October 1899, Thesiger and the second battalion were sent for service in South Africa in the aftermath of the outbreak of the Second Boer War. There, Thesiger saw action and was badly wounded during the battle at Wagon Hill during the Siege of Ladysmith on 6 January 1900. He was mentioned in dispatches for his conduct during the engagement, and received a brevet appointment as lieutenant colonel in the South African honours list on 29 November 1900.

Evacuated to Britain to recover from his wounds, Thesiger attended the Staff College, Camberley, which he entered in January 1902 upon being seconded from his regiment and from which he graduated in late 1902. On 7 May 1902 he was appointed a deputy-assistant adjutant-general for Musketry, and until 1906 was in charge of musketry practice on Salisbury Plain, for the 2nd Army Corps. He was promoted to brevet colonel in November 1906. From there he moved to Ireland to work as assistant military secretary to General Sir Neville Lyttelton, the general officer commanding in Dublin, a post he held from May 1908 until 1909.

From there he was assigned to colonial service as the inspector general of the King's African Rifles and in 1913 was dispatched to India as a lieutenant colonel to command the 4th Battalion of the Rifle Brigade. In 1913, in reward for his distinguished service, he was appointed a Companion of the Order of St Michael and St George (CMG), and the following year was also made a Companion of the Order of the Bath (CB) in the 1914 New Year Honours.

In 1902, Thesiger married Frances Fremantle, daughter of General Fitzroy William Fremantle, and the couple had two children, daughter Oona Thesiger (later Buckley) and son Gerald Thesiger, who became a notable High Court Judge and minor politician.

== First World War ==
At the outbreak of the First World War in the summer of 1914, Thesiger and his men were still in India. As a result, they did not arrive on the Western Front until December, by which time they formed part of the 80th Infantry Brigade of the 27th Division.

In May, he was promoted to (temporary) brigadier general and given command of the 2nd Infantry Brigade in the place of Brigadier General Claude Berners Westmacott, part of the 1st Division of the British Expeditionary Force (BEF). The brigade was then serving in the trenches during the spring of 1915, where he was again mentioned in despatches, although he did not lead it in any major actions.

On 27 August, Thesiger was again promoted, this time to the temporary rank of major general, and placed in charge of the 33rd Division, one of the new divisions of Kitchener's Army created just the year before, then undergoing training in Britain. He was only in this position for just over a week when on 8 September, he was again transferred to command another division, the 9th (Scottish), another division of Kitchener’s Army, which was then serving on the Western Front and which he would command during the opening of the forthcoming Battle of Loos. He took over from Major General Herman Landon.

Two days after the battle, the largest yet fought by the (BEF) in the war, Thesiger became one of three division commanders involved in the battle to lose his life.

Major-General Thesiger, commanding the 9th Division, having heard that the 73rd Infantry Brigade was unsteady, had gone forward, personally, to investigate the situation about Fosse 8, but on reaching the eastern face of the Hohenzollern he, with two of his Staff officers, was killed.

Killed alongside Thesiger, according to the war diary of the 9th Division's 26th Infantry Brigade, were Major Le Mottee, his general staff officer, grade 2 (GSO2), and Lieutenant Burney, his aide-de-camp, who were "all killed in the Hohenzollern Redoubt on the 27th not far from the western face". None of their bodies were removed from the battlefield as fighting continued for another day and consequently only Burney's remains were recovered some time later. Major General Thesiger's name is amongst the 20,000 recorded on Panel 129 on the Loos Memorial to the missing.

== See also ==
- List of generals of the British Empire who died during the First World War

== Notes ==
Military offices
Preceded by Herman Landon	GOC 9th (Scottish) Division; September 1915	Succeeded by William Furse
