= Richard Bannatine-Allason =

British Army officer (1855–1940)

Major-General Sir Richard Bannatine-Allason KCB CMG
- Major-General Bannatine-Allason in 1924
- Born: 22 September 1855
- Died: 1940 (aged 84−85)
- Military career
- Allegiance: United Kingdom
- Branch: British Army
- Service years: 1875−1918
- Rank: Major-General
- Unit: Royal Artillery
- Commands: 51st (Highland) Division
- Conflicts: Second Anglo-Afghan War; Second Boer War; Russo-Japanese War; First World War
- Awards: Knight Commander of the Order of the Bath; Companion of the Order of St Michael and St George

Major-General Sir Richard Bannatine-Allason, KCB, CMG (22 September 1855 – 1940) was a senior British Army officer.

== Military career ==
Bannatine-Allason was born Richard Allason Bannatine. Educated at Wellington College, he was commissioned into the Royal Artillery in January 1875 and saw action in the Second Anglo-Afghan War in 1879. He changed his name to Richard Bannatyne-Allason in 1885.

He saw further action in the Second Boer War, and after the war had ended stayed in South Africa as Colonel on the Staff for Royal Artillery from August 1902. Three years later, he became a military attaché serving with Japanese forces during the Russo-Japanese War.

He became commander of the Nowshera Brigade in India on 13 April 1910 and General Officer Commanding Highland Division, Territorial Force (TF), on 27 August 1914 at the start of the First World War, taking over from Major General Colin Mackenzie. He landed in France with his division in May 1915 and saw action at the Battle of Festubert on the Western Front later that month before handing over command to Major General George Harper in September. He returned to the UK and commanded the 61st (2nd South Midland) Division until February 1916; he later also commanded the 64th (2nd Highland) Division also in the UK before retiring from the army on 10 September 1918.

He was appointed a Companion of the Order of St Michael and St George on 1 January 1919 and a Knight Commander of the Order of the Bath on 1 January 1926.

Military offices
Preceded by Colin Mackenzie	GOC 51st (Highland) Division; 1914−1915	Succeeded by George Harper
Preceded by The Marquess of Salisbury	GOC 61st (2nd South Midland) Division; 1915−1916	Succeeded by Sir Colin Mackenzie
Preceded by George Stockwell	GOC 64th (2nd Highland) Division; 1916−1917	Succeeded by Herman Landon
