= George Stockwell =

British Army officer

Major-General George Stockwell CMG DSO
- Born: 24 July 1863
- Died: 21 March 1936 (aged 72)
- Military career
- Allegiance: United Kingdom
- Branch: British Army
- Service years: 1882–1917
- Rank: Major-General
- Conflicts: Second Boer War; First World War
- Awards: Distinguished Service Order; Companion of the Order of St Michael and St George

Major-General George Clifton Inglis Stockwell, CMG, DSO (24 July 1863 – 21 March 1936) was a British Army officer who served as General Officer Commanding 64th (2nd Highland) Division.

== Military career ==
Stockwell was commissioned into the Wiltshire Regiment on 9 September 1882. He transferred to the Highland Light Infantry (HLI) on 21 October 1882 and, promoted to lieutenant in September 1892, saw action during the Chitral Expedition in 1895. He attended the Staff College, Camberley, from 1898 to 1899.

He fought at the Battle of Witpoort in July 1900 during the Second Boer War. For his services there he was awarded the Distinguished Service Order (DSO) in the South Africa Honours list, published on 26 June 1902.

Made a major in August 1902, he later was promoted to lieutenant colonel in November 1907 when he took command of a battalion of the HLI. After commanding the battalion for four years he was placed on half-pay in November 1911 and was promoted to colonel, dated back to August. In January 1912, however, he reverted to normal pay and was placed in command of an infantry brigade of the Territorial Force.

He became commander of the 153rd Infantry Brigade on 22 January 1912 and was promoted to the temporary rank of brigadier general in August 1914 and was made a division commander and General Officer Commanding 64th (2nd Highland) Division on 25 January 1915 during the First World War. He was placed on half-pay and reverted in rank to substantive colonel due to ill health in February 1916. He was promoted to honorary brigadier general in January 1917 and retired from the army on 6 July 1917 and was granted the honorary rank of major general in September.

He was appointed a Companion of the Distinguished Service Order (DSO) for his service in South Africa on 26 June 1902 and was appointed a Companion of the Order of St Michael and St George (CMG) in 1918.

Military offices
New title	GOC 64th (2nd Highland) Division; 1915−1916	Succeeded by Richard Bannatine-Allason
