= Colin Mackenzie (British Army officer) =

British Army general (1861–1956)

Major-General Sir Colin Mackenzie KCB
- Portrait by Walter Stoneman, 1919
- Born: 26 November 1861
- Died: 7 July 1956 (aged 94); London, England
- Military career
- Branch: British Army
- Service years: 1881–1920
- Rank: Major-General
- Units: Bedfordshire Regiment; Seaforth Highlanders
- Commands: 6th Brigade; Chief of the General Staff; Highland Division; 9th (Scottish) Division; 15th (Scottish) Division; 3rd Division; 61st (2nd South Midland) Division; Dover Area
- Conflicts: Second Boer War; First World War
- Awards: Knight Commander of the Order of the Bath

Major-General Sir Colin John Mackenzie KCB (26 November 1861 – 7 July 1956) was a British soldier and Chief of the General Staff, the head of the Canadian Militia (later the Canadian Army), from 1910 until 1913.

== Background ==
Mackenzie was the eldest son of Major-General Colin Mackenzie, of the Madras Staff Corps, by Victoria Henrietta Mackinnon (the eldest daughter of Charles Mackinnon of Corriechatachan). His paternal grandfather, John Mackenzie of Inverness, a banker, was descended from the Mackenzies of Portmore.

== Early military career ==
Educated at Edinburgh Academy and at the Royal Military College at Sandhurst, Mackenzie was commissioned as a subaltern, with the rank of second lieutenant, into the 16th (Bedfordshire) Regiment of Foot on 22 January 1881, but soon transferred into the 78th Regiment of Foot (Highlanders) (The Ross-Shire Buffs) on 18 May; just prior to its amalgamation with the 72nd (Duke of Albany's Own Highlanders) Regiment of Foot, to form the 2nd Battalion of the Seaforth Highlanders.

Mackenzie took part in the Nile expedition of 1882, the Burma expedition of 1886 and the Hazara expedition in 1888, and was promoted to captain on 25 October 1889. Following promotion to major on 27 April 1892, he served as deputy assistant adjutant general for the Quetta District of India from 1892 to 1896. He also took part in the Waziristan expedition of 1894 and, after attending the Staff College, Camberley, from 1897 to 1898, he took part in the Nile expedition of 1898.

== Second Boer War ==
The following year Mackenzie went to South Africa on the outbreak of the Second Boer War, and from February 1900 he served as a director of military intelligence on the staff of the commander-in-chief (C-in-C), General Lord Roberts, and for which he was raised to the temporary rank of lieutenant colonel whilst employed in this position. In a despatch dated 31 March 1900, Lord Roberts described how Mackenzie "afforded … material assistance by the accurate and valuable reports he submitted". He received the brevet rank of lieutenant colonel on 29 November 1900. In the later stages of the war, he became Military Governor of Johannesburg.

Following the end of hostilities in May 1902, he returned to the United Kingdom in the SS Dunottar Castle, which arrived at Southampton the following month. For his service in the war, Mackenzie was appointed a Companion of the Order of the Bath (CB) in the April 1901 South Africa Honours list (the award was dated to 29 November 1900), and he received the actual decoration after his return home, from King Edward VII at Buckingham Palace on 24 October 1902.

== Between the wars ==
In September 1902 he received the substantive rank of lieutenant-colonel, and was appointed Assistant Quartermaster General for the 5th Division, within the 2nd Army Corps, based in Dover as part of the staff of the South-Eastern military district. He was Assistant Adjutant General at Army Headquarters from June 1905 and, after being promoted to the temporary rank of brigadier general in March 1907, became commander of the 6th Infantry Brigade at Aldershot Command, taking over from Major General Herbert Belfield.

He was promoted to major general in July 1910. From 1910 to 1913, he was Chief of the General Staff, Canada. His departure from that post was caused in part by a disagreement between Mackenzie and Sam Hughes, the Canadian Minister of Militia and Defence, as to (among other things) the merits of the Ross rifle. Mackenzie subsequently regarded himself as vindicated by the Ross rifle's unsuitability for combat conditions on the Western Front.

On 3 March 1914, he became GOC Highland Division of the Territorial Force (TF), taking over from Lieutenant General Charles Woollcombe.

== First World War ==
Towards the end of August, shortly after the British entry into World War I, he became GOC of the 9th (Scottish) Division, a newly created Kitchener's Army formation.

This only lasted until October when he was selected to succeed Major General Hubert Hamilton, GOC of the 3rd Division of the British Expeditionary Force (BEF) on the Western Front, who had recently been killed in action. However, he only lasted for a mere two weeks in this post before he was relieved of his command following the inconclusive result at the Battle of La Bassée later in October.

Upon returning to Britain, he went on to be GOC 15th (Scottish) Division, another Kitchener's Army formation, in December, before becoming director of staff duties at the War Office from March 1915.

He served in this important position until becoming GOC of the 61st (2nd South Midland) Division in February 1916, taking over from Major General Richard Bannatine-Allason. Like his command of the Highland Division almost two years earlier, it was a TF formation, made up of civilian soldiers. The division departed for service on the Western Front in May and was engaged in the disastrous diversionary battle for the Somme offensive at Fromelles on 19 July. This controversial operation, half British and half Australian, led to the loss of many Australian and British soldiers and achieved very little. Casualties were: the 5th Australian Division had 5,513 casualties while Mackenzie's 61st Division had 1,547 casualties.

Mackenzie himself continued to serve as the 61st's GOC throughout 1917 and into 1918 until he was wounded by an enemy sniper on 27 April 1918 while he was visiting the line of the 183rd Infantry Brigade south of St. Floris, being shot through the cheek and parotid gland. The wound did not respond to treatment and he was evacuated sick to England on 31 May, which marked the end of his active service overseas. He was appointed a Knight Commander of the Order of the Bath on 31 May.

== Postwar and final years ==
Thereafter, Mackenzie was inspector of infantry in 1918 and commander of the Dover Area 1919 until his retirement from the army on 1 April 1920. He ceased to belong to the reserve of officers on 26 November 1928 Between July 1924 and 1931, he was colonel of the Seaforth Highlanders.

He died in London on 7 July 1956, at the age of 94, outliving many of his contemporaries and living through the Second World War.

== Family ==
Mackenzie married Ethel Ross, the daughter of Hercules Grey Ross I.C.S. and Mary Henderson. They had one son, Colin Hercules Mackenzie.

== Bibliography ==
- Davies, Frank (1997). Bloody Red Tabs: General Officer Casualties of the Great War 1914–1918. London: Pen & Sword Books. ISBN 978-0-85052-463-5.
- Ellis, A. D. (1920). The Story of the Fifth Australian Division, being an Authoritative Account of the Division's Doings in Egypt, France and Belgium (1st ed.). London: Hodder and Stoughton. OCLC 12016875.
- Miles, W. (1992) [1938]. Military Operations France and Belgium, 1916: 2nd July 1916 to the End of the Battles of the Somme. History of the Great War Based on Official Documents by Direction of the Historical Section of the Committee of Imperial Defence. Vol. II (Imperial War Museum & Battery Press ed.). London: Macmillan. ISBN 978-0-901627-76-6.

Military offices
Preceded by Sir William Otter	Chief of the General Staff in Canada; 1910–1913	Succeeded by Sir Willoughby Gwatkin
Preceded by Charles Woollcombe	GOC Highland Division; March–August 1914	Succeeded by Richard Bannatine-Allason
New post	GOC 9th (Scottish) Division; August−October 1914	Succeeded by Sir Charles Fergusson
Preceded by Hubert Hamilton	GOC 3rd Division; October 1914	Succeeded by Aylmer Haldane
Preceded by Richard Bannatine-Allason	GOC 61st (2nd South Midland) Division; 1916−1918	Succeeded by John Duncan
Honorary titles
Preceded by Robert Murray	Colonel of the Seaforth Highlanders; 1924–1931	Succeeded by Sir Archibald Ritchie
