= 64th (2nd Highland) Division =

- Active: 1914 – 1919
- Country: United Kingdom
- Branch: British Army
- Type: Infantry
- Role: Home defence
- Size: Division
- Garrison/HQ: East Anglia, United Kingdom
- Service: First World War

Commanders
- Notable commanders: Herman Landon; Henry Lukin; John Edward Capper

The 64th (2nd Highland) Division was an infantry division of the British Army, raised during the Great War. The division was formed in late 1914 as a second-line Territorial Force formation which served on home defence duties throughout the war.

The division was formed as a duplicate of the 51st (Highland) Division in 1914, composed primarily of soldiers from Highland regiments recruited in northern and central Scotland. By 1917-18, however, it had become a training unit composed of conscripts from throughout Britain. It remained on home defence and training duties in Scotland and England throughout the war, and disbanded in early 1919 following the Armistice of 11 November 1918.

== History ==
The division was created as the "2nd Highland Division", a second-line formation of the Highland Division at the end of August 1914. At this time, Territorial Force soldiers could not be deployed overseas without their consent and the Territorial units were accordingly split into a "first line", with men who had volunteered for overseas service, and a "second line", which was intended for home service only. The second line units also served to absorb the large number of new, untrained, recruits who had joined the Territorial Force following the outbreak of war. The division's units formed through late 1914 and assembled as a coherent unit in January 1915.

As with the original Highland Division, the 2nd Highland was organised into three infantry brigades. These were later numbered as the 191st, composed of the 2/4th, 2/5th, and 2/6th Seaforth Highlanders, 2/4th Cameron Highlanders, and 2/4th Black Watch; the 192nd, composed of the 2/4th, 2/5th, 2/6th, and 2/7th Gordon Highlanders and 2/6th and 2/7th Black Watch; and the 193rd, composed of the 2/6th, 2/7th, 2/8th, and 2/9th Argyll and Sutherland Highlanders. With fifteen battalions, the 2nd Highland had a higher nominal strength than its parent division; the three additional units came from the second-line units of the Black Watch Brigade, assigned to the division as it assembled in January 1915.

The 191st Brigade recruited from the far north of Scotland; the 192nd from the north-east and Aberdeen; and the 193rd from central and western Scotland. The Black Watch battalions were recruited from Fife, Dundee and Perthshire. The division also raised second-line Territorial artillery, medical, signal and engineer units, from the same areas.

Through the next two years, the 2nd Highland, numbered as the 64th Division in 1915, provided trained men for its parent unit as well as carrying out home defence duties. The division was assembled in Fife and Perthshire. In mid-1915 the strength of its infantry battalions was set at a minimum 600 men, with any more than this being transferred overseas; later that year, all the infantry battalions were renumbered and several were amalgamated. The old unit numbering was reinstated in January 1916 but the amalgamations remained.

In 1916 the division howitzer brigade was broken up and its heavy artillery battery sent to France; a third field artillery brigade was briefly added but dissolved soon afterwards. In March 1916 the division was transferred to England, where it was stationed in East Anglia as part of Northern Army.

A second wave of reorganisation took place in 1917–18, with the division absorbing twelve "graduated battalions" – training units – and disbanding almost all of its original infantry units. By the time of the Armistice in November 1918, its infantry complement consisted entirely of graduated battalions. The division was demobilised shortly afterwards and ceased to exist in April 1919.

The division was not reformed during the Second World War, and the numbers for the subsidiary brigades were also not reused.

== Order of battle ==
The order of battle was as follows (organisation details are taken from The British Army in the Great War unless otherwise noted):

=== Organisation, early 1915 ===
Organisation as formed in January 1915.

2nd Seaforth and Cameron Highlanders Brigade
- 2/4th Battalion, Seaforth Highlanders
- 2/5th Battalion, Seaforth Highlanders
- 2/6th Battalion, Seaforth Highlanders
- 2/4th Battalion, Black Watch
2nd Gordon Highlanders Brigade
- 2/4th Battalion, Gordon Highlanders
- 2/5th Battalion, Gordon Highlanders
- 2/6th Battalion, Gordon Highlanders
- 2/7th Battalion, Gordon Highlanders
- 2/6th Battalion, Black Watch
- 2/7th Battalion, Black Watch
2nd Argyll and Sutherland Highlanders Brigade
- 2/6th Battalion, Argyll and Sutherland Highlanders
- 2/7th Battalion, Argyll and Sutherland Highlanders
- 2/8th Battalion, Argyll and Sutherland Highlanders
- 2/9th Battalion, Argyll and Sutherland Highlanders

Royal Engineers
- 2/1st Highland Field Company
- 3/2nd Highland Field Company
- 1/3rd Highland Field Company
- 2nd Highland Divisional Signal Company

Royal Army Medical Corps

- 2/2nd Highland Field Ambulance
- 2/3rd Highland Field Ambulance
- 3/1st Highland Field Ambulance
- 2/1st Highland Sanitary Section
Royal Artillery
- 2/I Highland Brigade, Royal Field Artillery
- 2/II Highland Brigade, RFA
- 2/III Highland (Howitzer) Brigade, RFA
- 2/1st Highland (Fifeshire) Heavy Battery, Royal Garrison Artillery
Divisional troops
- 64th Divisional Train, Army Service Corps
  (533rd, 534th, 535th and 536th Companies ASC)
- 2/1st Highland Mobile Veterinary Section AVC
- 64th Divisional Ambulance Workshop

=== Organisation, early 1916 ===
Organisation from January 1916 onwards

191st (2nd Seaforth and Cameron Highlanders) Brigade
- 2/4th Battalion, Seaforth Highlanders
- 2/6th Battalion, Seaforth Highlanders
- 2/4th Battalion, Black Watch
192nd (2nd Gordon Highlanders) Brigade
- 2/5th Battalion, Gordon Highlanders
- 2/7th Battalion, Gordon Highlanders
- 2/6th Battalion, Black Watch
- 2/7th Battalion, Black Watch
193rd (2nd Argyll and Sutherland Highlanders) Brigade
- 2/6th Battalion, Argyll and Sutherland Highlanders
- 2/7th Battalion, Argyll and Sutherland Highlanders
- 2/8th Battalion, Argyll and Sutherland Highlanders
- 2/9th Battalion, Argyll and Sutherland Highlanders

Royal Engineers
- 402nd (1/3rd Highland) Field Company
- 403rd (3/1st Highland) Field Company
- 405th (3/2nd Highland) Field Company
- 2nd Highland Divisional Signal Company

Royal Army Medical Corps

- 313th (2/1st Highland) Field Ambulance
- 314th (2/2nd Highland) Field Ambulance
- 315th (2/3rd Highland) Field Ambulance
- 2/1st Highland Sanitary Section
Royal Artillery
- CCCXX (2/I Highland) Brigade, RFA
- CCCXXI (2/II Highland) Brigade, RFA
- CCCXXII (2/III Highland) (Howitzer) Brigade, RFA
  (Broken up in May 1916)
- Bute Mountain Battery, RGA
  (From April – September 1916)
- 2/1st Highland (Fifeshire) Heavy Battery, RGA
  (Left in September 1916)
Divisional troops
- 64th Divisional Cyclist Company
- C Squadron, 2/1st Glasgow Yeomanry
- 64th Divisional Train, Army Service Corps
  (533rd, 534th, 535th and 536th Companies ASC)
- 2/1st Highland Mobile Veterinary Section AVC

=== Organisation, late 1918 ===
Organisation in November 1918, prior to disbandment

191st Brigade
- 51st (Graduated) Battalion, Highland Light Infantry
  (Formerly 201st Graduated Battalion)
- 51st (Graduated) Battalion, Gordon Highlanders
  (Formerly 202nd Graduated Battalion)
- 51st (Graduated) Battalion, Royal Sussex Regiment
- 52nd (Graduated) Battalion, Royal Sussex Regiment
192nd Brigade
- 52nd (Graduated) Battalion, Highland Light Infantry
  (Formerly 205th Graduated Battalion)
- 51st (Graduated) Battalion, Devonshire Regiment
  (Formerly 206th Graduated Battalion)
- 52nd (Graduated) Battalion, Queen's (Royal West Surrey Regiment)
- 52nd (Graduated) Battalion, Devonshire Regiment
193rd Brigade
- 51st (Graduated) Battalion, Middlesex Regiment
  (Formerly 209th Graduated Battalion)
- 52nd (Graduated) Battalion, Middlesex Regiment
- 51st (Graduated) Battalion, Bedfordshire Regiment
- 52nd (Graduated) Battalion, Bedfordshire Regiment

Royal Engineers
- 402nd (1/3rd Highland) Field Company
- 403rd (3/1st Highland) Field Company
- 405th (3/2nd Highland) Field Company
- 2nd Highland Divisional Signal Company

Royal Army Medical Corps

- 313th (2/1st Highland) Field Ambulance
- 314th (2/2nd Highland) Field Ambulance
- 315th (2/3rd Highland) Field Ambulance
- 2/1st Highland Sanitary Section
Royal Artillery
- CCCXX (2/I Highland) Brigade, RFA
- CCCXXI (2/II Highland) Brigade, RFA
Divisional troops
- 64th Divisional Cyclist Company
- 64th Divisional Train, Army Service Corps
  (533rd, 534th, 535th and 536th Companies ASC)

== General Officer Commanding ==
General Officers Commanding included:

- Brigadier-General George Stockwell January 1915 - February 1916
- Major-General Richard Bannatine-Allason February 1916 - c.August 1917
- Major-General Herman Landon August 1917 - April 1918
- Major-General Henry Lukin April 1918 - November 1918
- Major-General John Capper November 1918 - May 1919

== See also ==
- List of British divisions in World War I
