= 61st (2nd South Midland) Division =

British Army infantry division in the First World War

- Division insignia
- Active: January 1915 – January 1919
- Country: United Kingdom
- Branch: British Army
- Type: Infantry
- Engagements: First World War Battle of Fromelles

The 61st (2nd South Midland) Division was an infantry division of the British Army raised in 1915 during the Great War as a second-line reserve for the first-line battalions of the 48th (South Midland) Division. The division was sent to the Western Front in May 1916 and served there for the duration of the First World War.

== Unit history ==
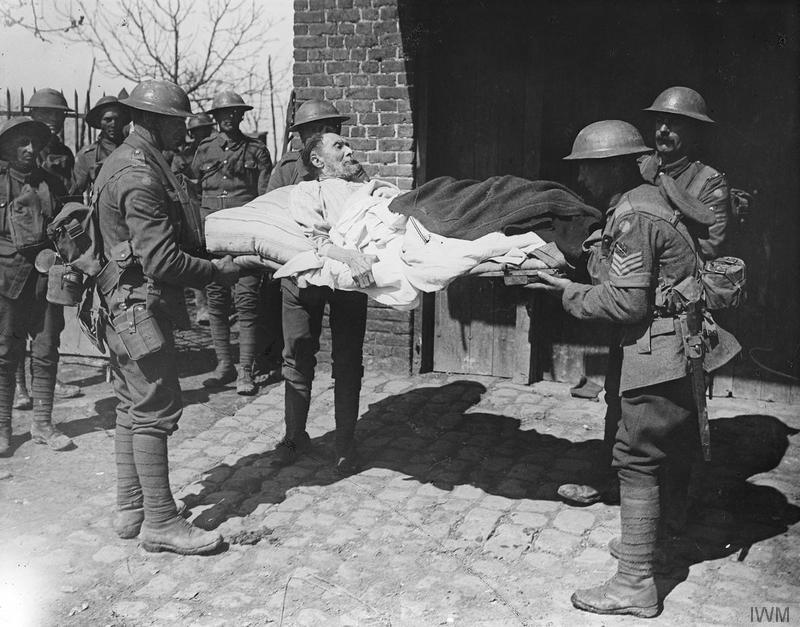
Battle of Hazebrouck. Men of the 2/7th Battalion, Royal Warwickshire Regiment, moving a bed-ridden elderly man of Robecq, 12 April 1918.

The division landed in France in May 1916. On 19 July 1916, together with the 5th Australian Division, the 61st Division fought the Battle of Fromelles, designed as a feint attack as part of the Somme Offensive. The attack, against well prepared German positions based on a ridge, was a disaster and responsible for the subsequent poor reputation of the Division.

The division later took part in the advance to the Hindenburg Line and the Battle of Passchendaele.

== Order of Battle ==
The order of battle was as follows:

182nd (2nd Warwickshire) Brigade

- 2/5th Battalion, Royal Warwickshire Regiment (disbanded February 1918)
- 2/6th Battalion, Royal Warwickshire Regiment
- 2/7th Battalion, Royal Warwickshire Regiment
- 2/8th Battalion, Royal Warwickshire Regiment (disbanded February 1918)
- 2/8th Battalion, Worcestershire Regiment (from 183rd Bde. February 1918)

183rd (2nd Gloucester and Worcester) Brigade

The brigade contained the following battalions until February 1918 when most of them were disbanded.

- 2/4th (City of Bristol) Battalion, Gloucestershire Regiment
- 2/6th Battalion, Gloucestershire Regiment
- 2/7th Battalion, Worcestershire Regiment
- 2/8th Battalion, Worcestershire Regiment (to 182nd Bde. February 1918)

Between February and June 1918 the 183rd Brigade contained the following battalions.

- 1/9th (Highlanders) Battalion, Royal Scots (Lothian Regiment)
- 1/5th (Buchan and Formartin) Battalion, Gordon Highlanders
- 1/8th (Argyllshire) Battalion, Argyll and Sutherland Highlanders

From May 1918 the following battalions joined the Brigade.

- 1st Battalion, East Lancashire Regiment
- 9th (Service) Battalion, Northumberland Fusiliers
- 11th (Service) Battalion, Suffolk Regiment (Cambridgeshire)

184th (2nd South Midland) Brigade

- 2/5th Battalion, Gloucestershire Regiment
- 2/4th Battalion, Oxfordshire and Buckinghamshire Light Infantry
- 2/1st Buckinghamshire Battalion, Oxfordshire and Buckinghamshire Light Infantry (disbanded February 1918)
- 2/4th Battalion, Royal Berkshire Regiment

Divisional Troops

- 1/5th Bn, the Duke of Cornwall's Light Infantry joined as Divisional Pioneer Bn April 1916
- 267th Machine Gun Company joined 18 January 1918, moved to 61st Bn MGC 1 March 1918
- 61st Battalion MGC formed 1 March 1918

Divisional Mounted Troops

- 2/1st Bedfordshire Yeomanry joined October 1915, left February 1916
- 2/2nd County of London Yeomanry joined 24 January 1916, left February 1916
- C Sqn, 1/1st Hampshire Yeomanry joined 18 March 1916, left 7 June 1916
- 2nd South Midland Divisional Cyclist Company left June 1916

61st (2nd South Midland) Divisional Artillery
(the artillery of 59th Division was also attached between 8 and 26 August 1918)

- CCCV (2/I South Midland) Brigade, Royal Field Artillery (RFA) broken up 17 September 1916
- CCCVI (2/II South Midland) Brigade, RFA
- CCCVII (2/III South Midland) Brigade, RFA
- CCCVIII (2/IV S.M.) (Howitzer) Brigade, RFA broken up 27 January 1917
- 2/1st South Midland (Warwicks) Heavy Battery, Royal Garrison Artillery (RGA) left 3 February 1916
- 2/2nd London Heavy Battery RGA joined 24 January 1916, left 3 February 1916
- 1/1st Wessex Heavy Battery RGA attached 24 January to February 1916
- 2/1st Wessex Heavy Battery RGA attached 24 January to February 1916
- 61st Divisional Ammunition Column RFA
- V.61 Heavy Trench Mortar Battery, RFA formed by 16 August 1916; left 7 February 1918
- X.61, Y.61 and Z.61 Medium Mortar Batteries, RFA formed June 1916; on 7 February 1918, Z broken up and batteries reorganised to have 6 x 6-inch weapons each

61st (2nd South Midland) Divisional Engineers

- 477th (2/1st South Midland) Field Company moved independently to France and joined 48th Division June 1915
- 478th (2/2nd South Midland) Field Company
- 479th (3/1st South Midland) Field Company
- 476th (1/3rd South Midland) Field Company joined by May 1916
- 61st Divisional Signals Company

Royal Army Medical Corps

- 2/1st South Midland Field Ambulance
- 2/2nd South Midland Ambulance
- 2/3rd South Midland Field Ambulance
- 61st Sanitary Section left for IV Corps 12 April 1917

Other Divisional Troops

- 61st Divisional Train ASC 521, 522, 523 and 524 Companies ASC
- 2/1st South Midland Mobile Veterinary Section AVC
- 251st Divisional Employment Company joined 7 June 1917

== Battles ==
- Battle of Fromelles

== General Officer Commanding ==
Commanding officers were:

- Brigadier-General The Marquess of Salisbury, September 1915 – December 1915
- Major-General Richard Bannatine-Allason, December 1915 – February 1916
- Major-General Sir Colin Mackenzie, KCB, February 1916 – May 1918
- Major-General F. John Duncan, CB, CMG, DSO 1918

== See also ==
- List of British divisions in World War I
