= John Duncan (British Army officer, born 1870) =

British Army officer

Major-General John Duncan CB CMG DSO
- Born: 16 May 1870
- Died: 1960 (aged 89−90)
- Military career
- Allegiance: United Kingdom
- Branch: British Army
- Service years: 1889−
- Rank: Major-General
- Unit: Royal Scots
- Commands: 165th (Liverpool) Brigade; 214th Brigade; 60th Brigade; 61st (2nd South Midland) Division
- Conflicts: Second Boer War; First World War
- Awards: Companion of the Order of the Bath; Companion of the Order of St Michael and St George; Distinguished Service Order

Major-General Francis John Duncan CB, CMG, DSO (16 May 1870 – 1960) was a senior British Army officer.

== Military career ==
Educated at Shrewsbury School, Duncan was commissioned into the Royal Scots on 21 September 1889.

After serving in the Second Boer War, he became military commandant at Edenburg in South Africa. On 18 August 1901 he was placed in command of a battalion of mounted infantry, for which he was granted the local rank of major whilst so employed. He was promoted to brevet major in 1902 and his major's rank became substantive on 22 November 1905.

During the First World War he was deployed as a staff officer with the British Expeditionary Force (BEF), for which he was appointed a Companion of the Distinguished Service Order (DSO) in February 1915, and a Companion of the Order of St Michael and St George (CMG) in March 1915. He then became commander of the 165th (Liverpool) Brigade in France January 1916, and was promoted to the temporary rank of brigadier general while employed in this role. He commanded the 214th Brigade in the UK in April 1917 and commander of the 60th Infantry Brigade in France in October 1917. He was promoted to the temporary rank of major general on 14 June 1918 and went on to succeed Major General Colin Mackenzie as general officer commanding (GOC) of the 61st (2nd South Midland) Division.

He was temporarily appointed as a military attaché in October 1919.

He was placed on half-pay in October 1923 and retired from the army on 7 June 1924 and was granted the honorary rank of major general. He ceased to belong to the Reserve of Officers on 16 May 1925.

== Family ==
In 1905 he married Lili Linder.

Military offices
Preceded by Sir Colin Mackenzie	GOC 61st (2nd South Midland) Division; 1918−1919	Post disbanded
