= 214th Brigade (United Kingdom) =

214th Brigade 214th Special Brigade
- Active: 1 November 1916 – 17 March 1919
- Country: United Kingdom
- Branch: British Army
- Type: Infantry
- Role: Home Defence; Training
- Size: Brigade
- Part of: 71st Division; 67th Division
- Service: World War I

Commanders
- Notable commanders: Brig-Gen L.E.A Price-Davies, VC

The 214th Brigade was an infantry formation of the British Army during World War I. It was raised as a second line brigade of the Territorial Force and initially assigned to the 71st Division for coast defence. Later it was reorganised as an all-arms brigade group for service in North Russia, but this was cancelled and it was reassigned to the 67th Division, a training and home defence formation, until the end of the war.

== Origin ==
In November 1916 the War Office decided to organise new Home Service divisions composed of 2nd Line and Home Service units of the Territorial Force (TF). 71st Division was one of these, formed in southern England. One of its brigades, the 214th, was created by simply redesignating 190th (2nd Durham Light Infantry) Brigade from the disbanded 63rd (2nd Northumbrian) Division. This comprised three 2nd Line battalions of the Durham Light Infantry (DLI) based at Catterick Camp and it assumed its new identity at Andover, Hampshire on 29 November 1916.

In the first week of March 1917 the division moved to Essex as part of Southern Army (Home Forces), where it was responsible for coastal defence from Mersea Island to Walton-on-the-Naze, where it stayed for the remainder of the year with 214th Bde at Colchester. During 1917 some of the 2nd Line TF units of the division were replaced by 'Graduated Battalions' of the Training Reserve (TR), in which 18–19-year-old recruits were progressively taken through the stages of training. In October these were numbered as battalions of county regiments.

== 214th Special Brigade ==
In October 1917, 214th Bde was redesignated 214th Special Brigade and filled with men of A1 medical category for overseas service. It also had a field artillery brigade, cyclist battalions, a field engineer company and machine gun companies attached to it. This brigade group was intended to go to Murmansk as part of the North Russia Intervention, but this never happened and most of the A1 men were drafted as reinforcements to the Western Front in March 1918 after the German Spring Offensive.

71st Division in turn was broken up on 12 February 1918 and 214th Special Bde joined 67th Division. This had formerly been the 2nd Home Counties Division (TF), but had lost its regional and territorial distinctiveness. The divisional HQ moved to East Anglia, with 214th Bde remaining at Colchester.

After fit men had been 'combed out' for the Western Front in March 1918, 67th Division was mostly composed of training battalions but 2/7th Bn DLI was still formally a 2nd Line TF battalion, and a year after initially being selected to form part of the Allied expedition to North Russia it finally went there as a garrison battalion. It entrained at Colchester for Glasgow on 5 October 1918, embarking the following day and disembarking at Arkhangelsk on 24 October. It served there until demobilised at the end of August 1919.

== Disbandment ==
After the Armistice with Germany in November 1918, the brigade was thoroughly reorganised again, with different Graduated Battalions and also Special Reserve (SR) battalions. However, demobilisation began in early 1919, and by 17 March the whole of 67th Division had been disbanded.

== Order of battle ==
=== From first formation ===
The composition of 214th Brigade was as follows:

- 2/6th Bn, Durham Light Infantry – joined 29 November 1916 from 190th (2nd DLI) Bde; left 1 September 1917 to 226th Mixed Bde
- 2/7th Bn, DLI – joined 29 November 1916 from 190th (2nd DLI) Bde
- 2/8th Bn, DLI – joined 29 November 1916 from 190th (2nd DLI) Bde; left by 9 July 1917
- 255th Graduated Bn, TR – previously 9th (Reserve) Battalion, Buffs (East Kent Regiment); joined by 9 July 1917 from 7th Reserve Brigade
- 256th Graduated Bn, TR – previously 24th (Reserve) Bn, Middlesex Regiment; joined by 12 November 1917 from 213th Bde, 71st Division
- 52nd (Graduated) Bn, Queen's (Royal West Surrey Regiment) – previously 255th Graduated Bn, TR
- 52nd (Graduated) Bn, Royal Sussex Regiment – previously 256th Graduated Bn, TR

=== Special brigade ===
The brigade had the following composition when it was reorganised as a brigade group for potential service in North Russia:

- 2/7th Bn, DLI – left by 23 September 1918 and joined Arkhangelsk Force
- XLIX Brigade, Royal Field Artillery – new unit formed at Colchester 22 October 1917, re-using the old number of XLIX (Howitzer) Bde RFA (14th (Light) Division), which had been broken up in October 1916; new unit disbanded by 25 March 1918
- 2/1st Warwickshire Yeomanry – cyclist unit joined on 26 October 1917; all fit men 'combed out' as reinforcements for the Western Front in March 1918; left by 2 September 1918
- 2/1st Hertfordshire Yeomanry – cyclist unit joined on 26 October 1917; 'combed out' in March 1918; left by 2 September 1918
- 252nd Machine-Gun Company, Machine-Gun Corps (MGC) – joined on 9 November 1917
- 253rd Machine-Gun Company, MGC – joined on 9 November 1917
- 16th (Home Service) Bn, Queen's – joined from 213th Bde by 12 November 1917; left by 28 October 1918
- 492nd (Home Counties) Field Company, Royal Engineers – transferred from 67th (2nd Home Counties) Division 12 February 1918; went to Murmansk with Syren Force late 1918
- 71st Divisional Signal Company, Royal Engineers – transferred with 214th Bde 12 February 1918

=== December 1918 reorganisation ===
The brigade had the following composition after the December 1918 reorganisation:

- 4th (Reserve) Bn, Buffs (SR)
- 4th (Reserve) Bn, Royal Welsh Fusiliers (SR)
- 51st (Graduated) Bn, Cheshire Regiment
- 52nd (Graduated) Bn, Cheshire Regiment

== Commanders ==
The following officers commanded 214th Bde during its existence:

- Brig-Gen W.C. Ross, from 1 November 1916
- Brig-Gen C.H. T Lucas, from 11 December 1916
- Brig-Gen F.J. Duncan, from 14 April 1917
- Brig-Gen L.E.A Price-Davies, VC, from 8 November 1917
- Brig-Gen A.G. Pritchard from 8 April 1918
- Brig-Gen F.W. Towsey, from 5 July 1918

== See also ==
- British infantry brigades of the First World War

== Bibliography ==
- Maj A.F. Becke,History of the Great War: Order of Battle of Divisions, Part 2b: The 2nd-Line Territorial Force Divisions (57th–69th), with the Home-Service Divisions (71st–73rd) and 74th and 75th Divisions, London: HM Stationery Office, 1937/Uckfield: Naval & Military Press, 2007, ISBN 1-847347-39-8.
- Maj A.F. Becke,History of the Great War: Order of Battle of Divisions, Part 3a: New Army Divisions (9–26), London: HM Stationery Office, 1938/Uckfield: Naval & Military Press, 2007, ISBN 1-847347-41-X.
- Clive Dunn, The Fighting Pioneers: the Story of the 7th Durham Light Infantry, Barnsley: Pen & Sword, 2015, ISBN 978-1-47382-348-8.
- James, Brigadier E.A. (1978). British Regiments 1914–18. London: Samson Books Limited. ISBN 0-906304-03-2.
- Col L.F. Morling, Sussex Sappers: A History of the Sussex Volunteer and Territorial Army Royal Engineer Units from 1890 to 1967, Seaford: 208th Field Co, RE/Christians–W.J. Offord, 1972.
