= South Wales Brigade =

- Active: 1 April 1908–17 April 1915
- Country: United Kingdom
- Branch: British Army
- Type: Infantry
- Size: Brigade
- Peacetime HQ: Cardiff
- Service: World War I

The South Wales Brigade was a Territorial Force infantry brigade of the British Army. Formed in 1908, it was not part of any division, instead serving as Army Troops, though attached to the Welsh Division in peacetime. It was dissolved in early 1915 as its constituent battalions were posted to other formations.

== History ==
The Territorial Force (TF) was formed on 1 April 1908 following the enactment of the Territorial and Reserve Forces Act 1907 (7 Edw.7, c.9) which combined and re-organised the old Volunteer Force, the Honourable Artillery Company and the Yeomanry. On formation, the TF contained 14 infantry divisions and 14 mounted yeomanry brigades. Three more infantry brigades also existed outside the divisional structure: the Black Watch Brigade, the Lothian Brigade and the South Wales Brigade.

The new brigade was a direct successor to the Welsh Brigade, one of the Volunteer Infantry Brigades in the mobilisation scheme introduced after the Stanhope Memorandum of 1888. Based at Cardiff, the Welsh Brigade was organised in 1902 by bringing together the four volunteer battalions of the Welsh Regiment, previously scattered among several brigades. The composition of the new South Wales Brigade in 1908 was almost identical, except that the Brecknock Battalion was transferred in from the South Wales Border Brigade to replace a volunteer battalion of the Welsh Regiment converted into a TF cyclist battalion.

The South Wales Brigade was organised as follows:

- Brigade Headquarters at 29 Windsor Place, Cardiff
- Brecknockshire Battalion, South Wales Borderers at Brecon
- 4th Battalion, Welsh Regiment at Carmarthen
- 5th Battalion, Welsh Regiment at Pontypridd
- 6th (Glamorgan) Battalion, Welsh Regiment at Swansea

The brigade was an Army Troops formation under Western Command but it was attached to the Welsh Division in peacetime.

=== World War I ===
On the outbreak of World War I the brigade mobilised on 4 August 1914 under Colonel D. Campbell, who had been brigade commander since 16 May 1914. The units proceeded to their war stations (Pembroke Dock in the case of the Brecknockshire Battalion).

Under the Territorial and Reserve Forces Act 1907 the TF was intended as a home defence force and members were not obliged to serve overseas. However, on 10 August TF units were invited to volunteer for Overseas Service, and the majority accepted. On 31 August, the formation of a reserve or 2nd Line unit was authorised for each 1st Line unit where 60 per cent or more of the men had volunteered for Overseas Service. The 1st Line battalions serving with the South Wales Brigade therefore received a distinguishing '1/' prefix.

On 29 October, the 1/1st Brecknockshire Battalion embarked at Southampton Docks bound for India, attached to the Home Counties Division as an extra battalion for garrison duty at Aden. Arriving at Bombay (Mumbai) on 3 December, it transhipped and departed Bombay again on 9 December, arriving at Aden on 16 December. After serving in Aden it returned to India in August 1915 and remained attached to 44th (Home Counties) Division for the remainder of the war.

Also on 29 October, 1/6th Welsh left the brigade for Line of Communication duties on the Western Front. It joined 84th Brigade, 28th Division on 5 July 1915, transferred to 3rd Brigade, 1st Division, on 23 October 1915, eventually becoming 1st Division's Pioneer Battalion on15 May 1916 and remaining with it for the rest of the war.

The rest of the brigade, now consisting of just two battalions, moved to Tunbridge Wells in November 1914 and to Scotland in February 1915 on the Tay and Forth Defences. On 17 April 1915, 1/4th and 1/5th Welsh left the brigade and joined the 159th (Cheshire) Brigade, 53rd (Welsh) Division at Bedford. With that, the brigade passed out of existence.

When the TF was reformed in 1920 and reorganised as the TA, 160th (Welsh Border) Brigade of 53rd (Welsh) Division was reformed as 160th (South Wales) Brigade and included the 4th, 5th and 6th Battalions, Welch Regiment.

== See also ==
- British infantry brigades of the First World War

== Bibliography ==
- Maj A.F. Becke,History of the Great War: Order of Battle of Divisions, Part 1: The Regular British Divisions, London: HM Stationery Office, 1934/Uckfield: Naval & Military Press, 2007, ISBN 1-847347-38-X.
- Maj A.F. Becke,History of the Great War: Order of Battle of Divisions, Part 2a: The Territorial Force Mounted Divisions and the 1st-Line Territorial Force Divisions (42–56), London: HM Stationery Office, 1935/Uckfield: Naval & Military Press, 2007, ISBN 1-847347-39-8.
- Maj A.F. Becke,History of the Great War: Order of Battle of Divisions, Part 2b: The 2nd-Line Territorial Force Divisions (57th–69th), with the Home-Service Divisions (71st–73rd) and 74th and 75th Divisions, London: HM Stationery Office, 1937/Uckfield: Naval & Military Press, 2007, ISBN 1-847347-39-8.
- Ian F.W. Beckett, Riflemen Form: A Study of the Rifle Volunteer Movement 1859–1908, Aldershot: Ogilby Trusts, 1982, ISBN 0 85936 271 X.
- Col John K. Dunlop, The Development of the British Army 1899–1914, London: Methuen, 1938.
- Brig-Gen Sir James E. Edmonds, History of the Great War: Military Operations, France and Belgium, 1914, Vol II, London: Macmillan, 1925/Imperial War Museum & Battery Press, 1995, ISBN 1-870423-55-0/Uckfield: Naval & Military Press, 2021, ISBN 978-1-78331-612-0.
- J.B.M. Frederick, Lineage Book of British Land Forces 1660–1978, Vol I, Wakefield: Microform Academic, 1984, ISBN 1-85117-007-3.
- Brig E.A. James, British Regiments 1914–18, London: Samson Books, 1978, ISBN 0-906304-03-2/Uckfield: Naval & Military Press, 2001, ISBN 978-1-84342-197-9.
- Rinaldi, Richard A (2008). Order of Battle of the British Army 1914. Ravi Rikhye. ISBN 978-0-97760728-0.
- Maj C.H. Dudley Ward, History of the 53rd (Welsh) Division (T.F.) 1914–1918, Cardiff: Western Mail, 1927/Uckfield: Naval & Military, 2004, ISBN 978-1-845740-50-4.
- War Office, Titles and Designations of Formations and Units of the Territorial Army, London: War Office, 7 November 1927.
- Westlake, Ray (1992). British Territorial Units 1914–18. Vol. 245 of Men-at-Arms Series. Osprey Publishing. ISBN 978-1-85532-168-7.

=== External links ===
- Chris Baker, The Long, Long Trail
- P.B. Chappell, The Regimental Warpath 1914–1918 (archive site)
- Mark Conrad, The British Army, 1914 (archive site)
