= Cerisy-Gailly Military Cemetery =

WWI CWGC cemetery in Somme, France

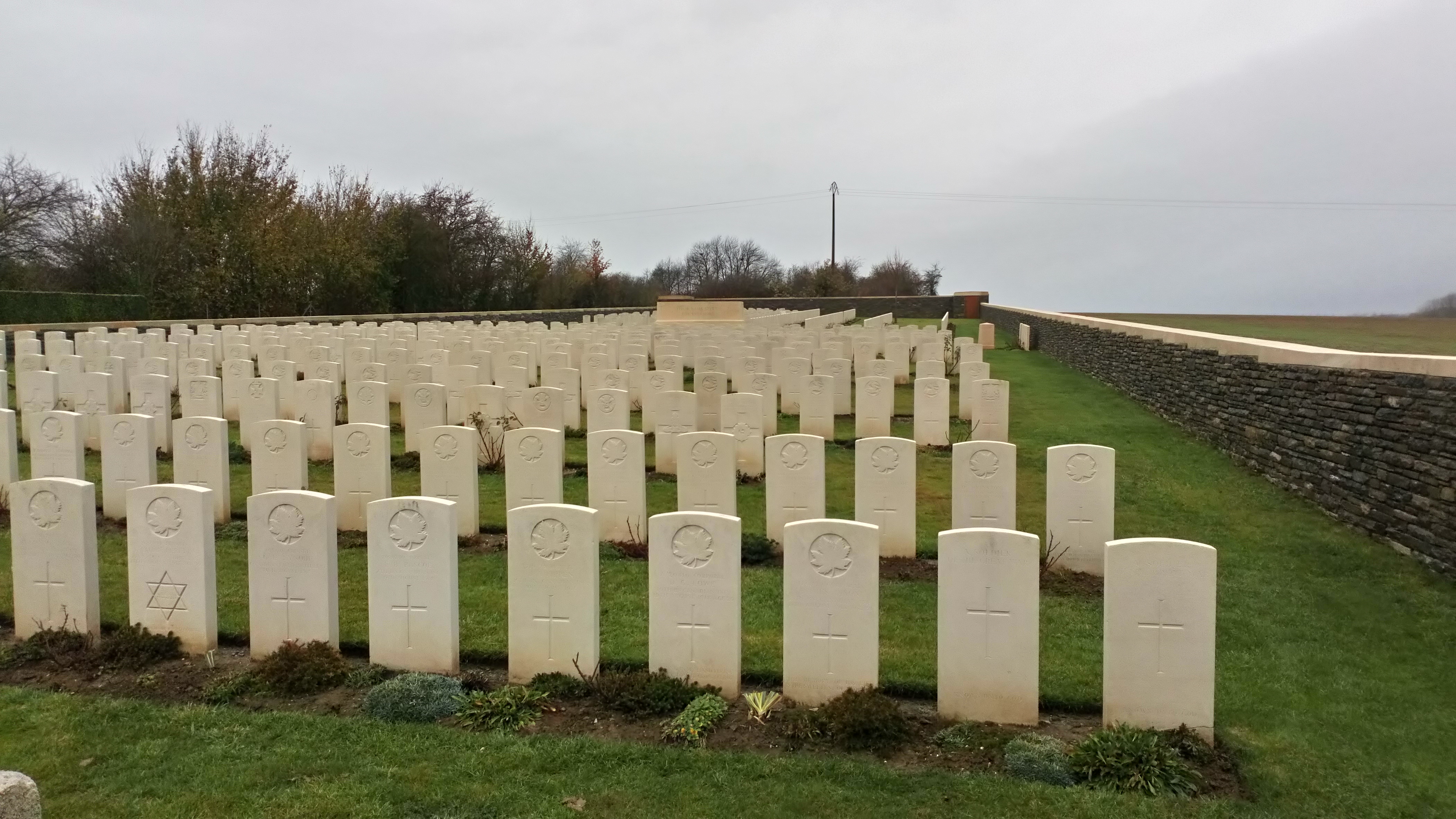

Details
- Established: February 1917
- Location: Cerisy, Somme, France
- Country: British and Commonwealth
- Coordinates: 49.9043°N 2.6312°E
- Type: Military
- Owned by: Commonwealth War Graves Commission (CWGC)
- No. of graves: 745 total, 633 identified
- Website: Official website
- Find a Grave: Cerisy-Gailly Military Cemetery

The Cerisy-Gailly Military Cemetery is a military cemetery located in the Somme region of France commemorating British and Commonwealth soldiers who fought in World War I. The cemetery contains mainly those who died on the front line near the village of Cerisy between February 1917 and March 1918 and during the Allied recapture of the village in August 1918.

== Location ==
The cemetery is located near Cerisy, a village approximately 10 kilometers southwest of the town of Albert, France on the D42 and D71 roads.

== Establishment of the cemetery ==
The cemetery was established in February 1917 as the New French Military Cemetery. It was used by the 39th and 13th Casualty Clearing Stations for much of early 1917, and by the 41st Stationary Hospital from May 1917 to March 1918, when the area was lost in the 1918 German spring offensive. It was used by the Australian Corps after they recaptured Cerisy in August 1918. More graves were moved in from other Somme battlefields and the surrounding area after the end of the war. The cemetery was designed by Sir Edwin Lutyens and William Harrison Cowlishaw.

=== Former burial sites moved to Cerisy-Gailly ===
Former burial sites of soldiers now buried in Cerisy-Gailly Military Cemetery include:

- Beaufort British Cemetery was located about 300 meters north of Beaufort Church. It was made in August, 1918 (after the capture of the Beaufort by the 1st Canadian Division). It was built between the existing German Cemetery and a farm track and contained the graves of 56 Canadian and 2 British soldiers.
- Buigny-Les-Gamaches Communal Cemetery contained one British soldier buried in July 1918 by the 26th Field Ambulance.
- Buire Communal Cemetery Extension, in the commune of Buire-Courcelles, was located to the north of the Communal Cemetery. It contained three German burials and one British burial. 36 Australian soldiers and four British soldiers were buried in the British plot, mostly from September 1918 (three had been buried by the Germans the preceding March).
- Maricourt Military Cemetery was located in the southeast corner of the village of Maricourt, on the road to Clery. It was begun by French troops in December, 1914, and was known as Ferme Caudron. It was taken over by British troops in August, 1915, and used until July, 1916. It contained the graves of 887 French soldiers, 260 from the United Kingdom and six Germans.
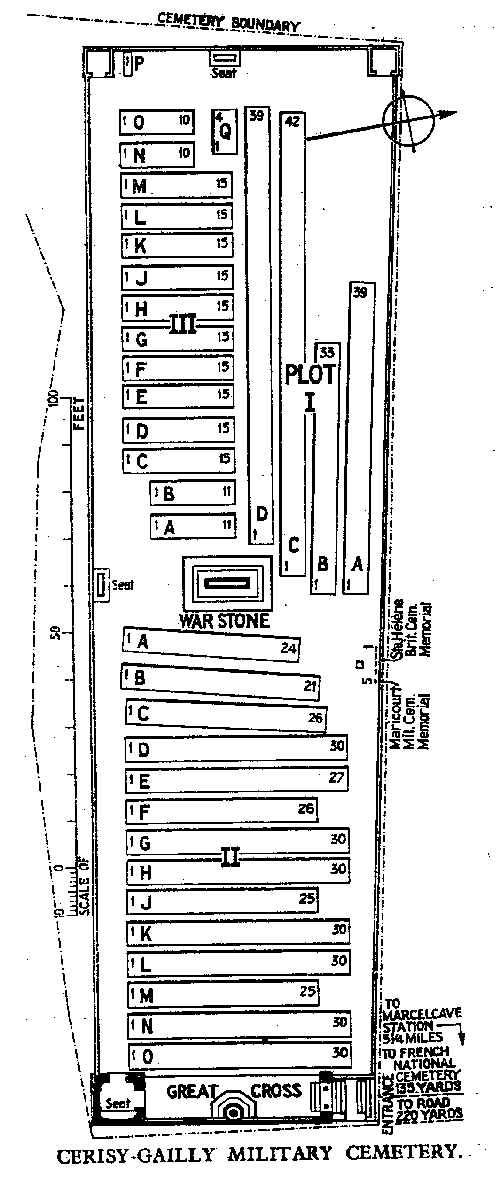
- Cerisy-Gailly Military Cemetery Plan
  Ste. Helene British Cemetery, Pontruet, was located on the east side of the hamlet of Ste. Helene. It was begun in September and October 1918 during the capture of the hamlet by the British 46th (North Midland) Division. and their subsequent attack at Pontruet. It contained the graves of 88 soldiers and one airman from the United Kingdom, mostly from the 46th Division or the 1st Dorsets.

=== Statistics ===
There are a total of 745 burials in the cemetery, of which 633 are identified and 114 are unidentified. Special memorials are dedicated to five lost burials in the vicinity of Maricourt and Ste. Helene. After the war, 158 French graves and 35 German graves were moved to other burial sites.

Identified Burials by Nationality
Nationality	Number of Burials
United Kingdom	597
South Africa	81
Canada	65
South Africa	2
