= Black Watch Brigade =

- Active: 1 April 1908–24 April 1915
- Country: United Kingdom
- Branch: British Army
- Type: Infantry
- Size: Brigade
- Peacetime HQ: Dundee
- Service: World War I

The Black Watch Brigade was a Territorial Force infantry brigade of the British Army. Formed in 1908, it was not part of any division, instead being assigned to Coastal Defence duties in Scottish Command. It was dissolved in early 1915 as its constituent battalions were posted to other formations.

== History ==
The Territorial Force (TF) was formed on 1 April 1908 following the enactment of the Territorial and Reserve Forces Act 1907 (7 Edw.7, c.9) which combined and re-organised the old Volunteer Force, the Honourable Artillery Company and the Yeomanry. On formation, the TF contained 14 infantry divisions and 14 mounted yeomanry brigades. Three more infantry brigades also existed outside the divisional structure: the Black Watch Brigade, the Lothian Brigade and the South Wales Brigade.

The brigade headquarters was at Dundee and, as the name would suggest, it was organized with four battalions of the Black Watch (Royal Highlanders):

- 4th (City of Dundee) Battalion at Dundee
- 5th (Angus and Dundee) Battalion at Arbroath
- 6th (Perthshire) Battalion at Perth
- 7th (Fife) Battalion at St Andrews

5th (Renfrewshire) Battalion, Princess Louise's (Argyll and Sutherland Highlanders) at Greenock was attached. The brigade was assigned to Scottish Coast Defences in Scottish Command.

=== World War I ===
In accordance with the Territorial and Reserve Forces Act 1907 (7 Edw.7, c.9) which brought the Territorial Force into being, the TF was intended to be a home defence force for service during wartime and members could not be compelled to serve outside the country. However, on the outbreak of war on 4 August 1914, many members volunteered for Imperial Service. Therefore, TF units were split into 1st Line (liable for overseas service) and 2nd Line (home service for those unable or unwilling to serve overseas) units. 2nd Line units performed the home defence role, although in fact most of these were also posted abroad in due course. Accordingly, the 2/1st Black Watch Brigade was formed as a duplicate formation in January 1915.

On mobilization, the brigade took up its wartime stations in accordance with pre-war plans: 1/4th Black Watch at Buddon near Carnoustie, 1/5th at Broughty Ferry on Tay Defences, 1/6th at Queensferry on Forth Defences, 1/7th at Kinghorn also on Forth Defences; 1/5th Argyll and Sutherland Highlanders was also on Scottish Coast Defences.

The brigade did not remain in existence for very much longer as the battalions were posted away. In October, the 1/5th Black Watch left for the Western Front, joining the 24th Brigade, 8th Division on 13 November. It was followed to France in February 1915 by the 1/4th Black Watch which joined the 21st (Bareilly) Brigade, 7th (Meerut) Division on 4 March 1915. On 16 April 1915, the 1/6th and 1/7th Black Watch departed for the 51st (Highland) Division, joining the 153rd (2nd Highland) Brigade at Bedford. Finally, the 1/5th Argyll and Sutherland Highlanders joined the 157th (Highland Light Infantry) Brigade, 52nd (Lowland) Division at Dunfermline on 24 April 1915. With that, the brigade passed out of existence.

== See also ==
- 2/1st Black Watch Brigade for the 2nd Line formation
- British infantry brigades of the First World War

== Bibliography ==
- Becke, Archibald F. (1935). Order of Battle of Divisions Part 1–The Regular British Divisions. London: HMSO. OCLC 4405016.
- Becke, Archibald F. (1936). Order of Battle of Divisions Part 2A. The Territorial Force Mounted Divisions and the 1st-Line Territorial Force Divisions (42–56). London: HMSO. OCLC 4405016.
- James, Brigadier E.A. (1978). British Regiments 1914–18. London: Samson Books Limited. ISBN 0-906304-03-2.
- Perry, F.W. (1993). Order of Battle of Divisions Part 5B. Indian Army Divisions. Newport: Ray Westlake Military Books. ISBN 1-871167-23-X.
- Rinaldi, Richard A (2008). Order of Battle of the British Army 1914. Ravi Rikhye. ISBN 978-0-97760728-0.
- Westlake, Ray (1992). British Territorial Units 1914–18. Vol. 245 of Men-at-Arms Series. Osprey Publishing. ISBN 978-1-85532-168-7.
