= Gloucestershire Regiment on the Somme =

Gloucestershire Regiment
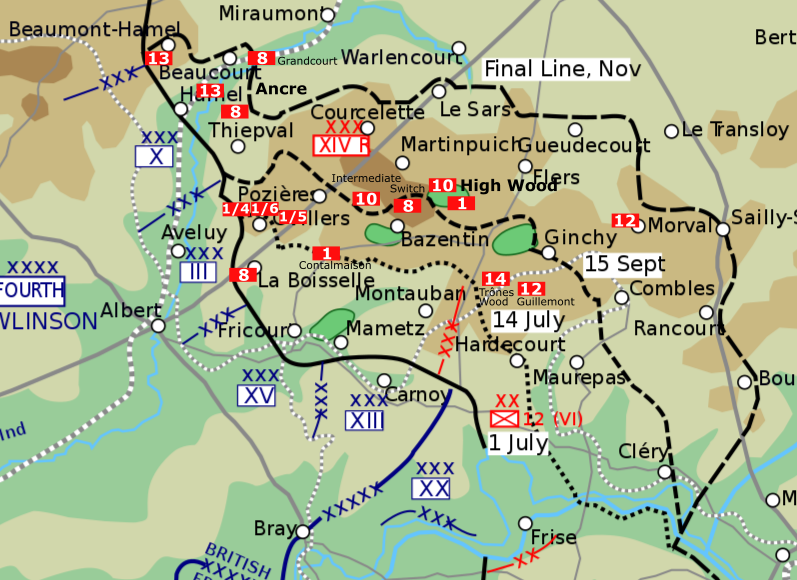
- Overview of the locations where each battalion of the Gloucestershire Regiment fought during the Battle of the Somme
- Active: 1881–1994
- Country: United Kingdom
- Branch: British Army
- Type: Infantry
- Role: Line infantry
- Garrison/HQ: Horfield Barracks, Bristol
- Nickname(s): The Glorious Glosters, Slashers
- Motto(s): By our deeds we are known
- March: The Kinnegad Slashers
- Anniversaries: Back Badge Day (21 Mar)

The Gloucestershire Regiment was formed in 1881 as a line infantry regiment of the British Army, and at the outbreak of World War I it comprised two regular battalions, three territorial battalions, and a reserve battalion. As the war progressed, it raised 18 more battalions, most of them New Army battalions of citizen soldiers answering Lord Kitchener's call to arms. The Battle of the Somme was one of many battles to involve the Gloucestershire Regiment in World War I. It was a major offensive launched on 1 July 1916 by the British Army, with French support, on the River Somme between Montauban in the south and Serre in the north. Initially planned to break through the German lines and restore mobile warfare to the Western Front, a stubborn defence by German forces in well-defended positions forced the British into a succession of battles and a lengthy war of attrition that was brought to a halt by bad weather on 18 November 1916.

Nine battalions of the Gloucestershire Regiment serving in six divisions saw action during the Somme offensive. Of this number, two – 1st and 10th Battalions – had already seen action in major battles, but for the remainder, other than trench warfare and raids, it was their first significant experience of battle. 8th Battalion was the first of the Glosters to see action during the offensive when it went into action around La Boiselle on the third day, and also the last when it was involved in the capture of Grandcourt on the final day of the offensive. In between, the various battalions of the regiment fought at Contalmaison, Bazentin-le-Petit, Ovillers, Pozières, the Leipzig Redoubt, High Wood, Guillemont, Morval, and on the Ancre. For actions during the offensive, one award of the Victoria Cross (VC), two awards of the Distinguished Service Order (DSO), 29 awards of the Distinguished Conduct Medal, and numerous awards of the Military Cross (MC) and Military Medal (MM) were made to men of the regiment.

== Background ==
The Gloucestershire Regiment was formed as a result of the Childers Reforms of 1881, and further restructured following the Territorial and Reserve Forces Act 1907. At the outbreak of World War I in 1914 the fighting establishment of the Gloucestershire Regiment comprised two regular and three territorial battalions, supported by a home-based unit, the 3rd (Special Reserve) Battalion, which trained new recruits and fed them into the line battalions During the course of the war the regiment raised an additional 18 battalions, ten of them New Army battalions recruited as a result of Kitchener's call to arms. Of the 24 battalions of the Gloucestershire Regiment, nine saw action in the Battle of the Somme:

Regular army:

- 1st Battalion, 3rd Brigade, 1st Division

Territorial Force:

- 1/4th (City of Bristol) Battalion, 144th (Gloucester & Worcester) Brigade, 48th Division
- 1/5th Battalion, 145th (South Midland) Brigade, 48th Division
- 1/6th Battalion, 144th Brigade, 48th Division

New army:

- 8th (Service) Battalion, 57th Brigade, 19th Division
- 10th (Service) Battalion, 1st Brigade, 1st Division
- 12th (Service) Battalion (Bristol's Own), 95th Brigade, 5th Division
- 13th (Service) Battalion (Forest of Dean), divisional pioneers, 39th Division
- 14th (Service) Battalion (West of England), 105th Brigade, 35th Division (Bantams)

1st Battalion was deployed to France at the start of the war, and had already seen extensive action. The territorials were deployed to France in March 1915, had served in the trenches and conducted patrols and raids, but had not been involved in any set-piece battles. 8th Battalion arrived in France in July 1915 and was in reserve during the Battle of Loos, but did not see any action. 10th Battalion arrived in France in August 1915, and had suffered very heavily as one of the assault battalions in the Battle of Loos. 12th Battalion arrived in France in December 1915, but had not been in action. The pioneers of 13th Battalion arrived in France in March 1916. 14th Battalion arrived in France in February 1916, and had been in action in a battalion-sized raid in June, but not in any set-piece battle.

At the Chantilly Conferences of 1915 the allies agreed to a coordinated effort designed to overwhelm the Austro-German defences. Part of this effort involved an Anglo-French offensive on the Somme, though the Battle of Verdun denuded French forces to such an extent that the Battle of the Somme became a predominantly British operation. The Somme had been a comparatively quiet sector, allowing the German 2nd Army ample time to prepare a defence in depth consisting of wide belts of wire, trenches, fortified villages and deep dug-outs.

The BEF commander, Sir Douglas Haig, favoured a breakthrough and return to mobile warfare. He planned for the Fourth Army – 25 divisions organised in 5 Corps – to overrun the German front line between Montauban in the south and Serre in the north, and capture the second line along the ridge between Poziéres and Miraumont on the River Ancre. He then hoped to break through the second line between Poziéres and Ginchy, capture the German third line in the area Morval–Flers–Le Sars, and threaten Bapaume. General Rawlinson, commanding the Fourth Army, favoured a more limited 'bite and hold' approach based on artillery bombardment and limited tactical advances. The artillery was, however, inadequate to the task, and the first day of the offensive was the bloodiest single day in British military history. Only in the southern sector, at Montauban and Mametz, did the British achieve their first-day objectives, advancing about 1 mile (1.6 km) on a front of some 3.5 miles (5.6 km), but Rawlinson did not seize the opportunity to exploit these, and the Somme offensive became a succession of battles and a lengthy war of attrition.

== Battle of Albert ==
Battalions involved: 8th

The Battle of Albert (1–13 July 1916) was the opening battle of the Somme offensive, and in the Albert–Bapaume road sector 34th Division attacked towards the village of La Boiselle. Although some gains were made along Sausage Valley south of La Boiselle, by the end of the first day the village itself remained in German hands, and the badly mauled 34th was relieved by 19th Division. Congestion caused by the withdrawal of 34th Division delayed 19th Division's deployment, and on 2 July only its 58th Brigade was able to get into action, capturing the western half of the village at 21:00.

In the early hours of 3 July, 8th Battalion North Staffordshire Regiment and 10th Battalion Worcestershire Regiment, both from 57th Brigade, attacked from the west and north of La Boiselle and with 58th Brigade captured the rest of the village. Shortly after, a German counter-attack regained the eastern end, and the remaining 57th Brigade battalions, 8th Glosters and 10th Battalion Royal Warwickshire Regiment, were sent into the village. As the fighting raged on, the commanders of the other three 57th Brigade battalions became casualties, and the 8th Glosters' commanding officer, Lieutenant-Colonel Adrian Carton de Wiart, assumed control of their commands. The village was finally captured on 4 July, and 8th Battalion was relieved the next day, having suffered 6 officers killed, 14 wounded and 282 other ranks killed, wounded or missing. For his actions in averting a serious reverse at La Boisselle Lieutenant-Colonel de Wiart, attached to 8th Battalion from the 4th Dragoon Guards (Royal Irish), was awarded the Victoria Cross (VC), which he credited to the 8th, "for every man in the Battalion has done as much as I have". The battalion adjutant, Captain Parkes, was awarded the MC, and Private Lugg was awarded the DCM for rescuing the wounded under heavy fire.

== Battle of Bazentin ==
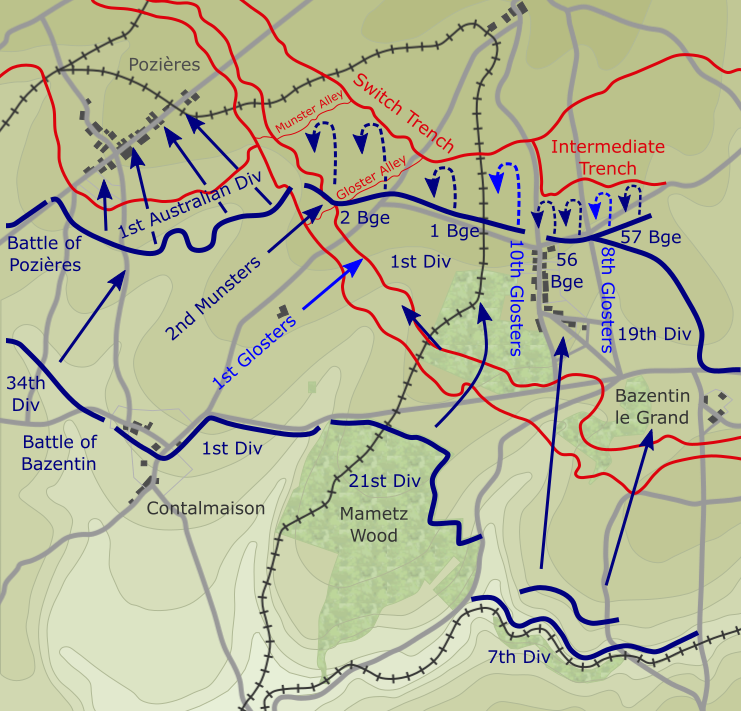
Actions of the 1st Glosters on 16 July (Battle of Bazentin), and 8th and 10th Glosters on 23 July (Battle of Pozières)

Battalions involved: 1st, 1/4th, 1/5th, 1/6th, 14th

The Battle of Bazentin (14–17 July) was an attack by seven divisions of the Fourth Army on the German second line from north of Contalmaison on the left flank to Longueval on the right. On the left of the attack the Reserve Army carried out subsidiary operations around Ovillers to divert attention from Fourth Army's attack. On 14 July, 34th Division advanced to just south of Pozières, and to their right, 1st Division gained ground north of Contalmaison. On the right of 1st Division, 21st Division captured Bazentin-le-Petit Wood and the village beyond, and on the far right flank 18th Division captured Trônes Wood, some 2.5 miles (4.0 km) south-east of Bazentin le Petit Wood.

The Glosters' 1st Battalion went into the line north-east of Contalmaison overnight on 14–15 July and, discovering that the ground in front of them was unoccupied, advanced the line some 200–300 yards (180–270 m) and occupied Contalmaison Villa. On the night of 16–17 July, 1st Battalion was part of an intricate attack by 3rd Brigade that occupied the German front-line and support trenches northwest of Bazentin-le-Petit Wood. Strongpoints were established in the communications trenches that ran between the two former enemy lines, and one of these trenches was renamed Gloster Alley. The attack cost the battalion three killed and 25 wounded.

As 1st Battalion consolidated its position, the regiment's three front-line territorial battalions were moving into the line west of Ovillers, 2.5 miles (4.0 km) to the west of Bazentin-le-Petit, and first into action on 16 July was 1/4th Battalion. For the next two days the battalion fought alongside 1/7th Worcesters to capture the German trenches west and northwest of Ovillers, while troops of the 25th Division captured Ovillers itself (on 17 July), at a cost to the 1/4th of 275 casualties. A DSO, two MCs and two DCMs were awarded for acts of gallantry during the fighting.

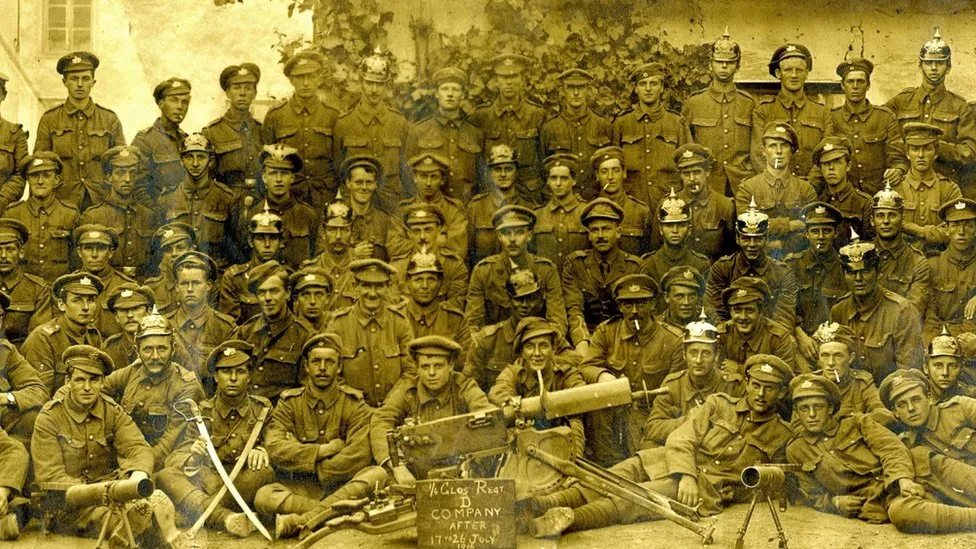
Soldiers of D Company, 1/4th Battalion, The Gloucestershire Regiment, with a captured German Maxim machine gun, and some wearing German helmets. A board in the foreground is dated "After 17-26 July 1916".

On 18 July, 35th Division relieved 18th Division at Trônes Wood. The Glosters' 14th Battalion went into the line at the northern end of the wood, and on 19 July it suffered 107 casualties.

== Battle of Pozières ==
Battalions involved: 1st, 1/4th, 1/5th, 1/6th, 8th, 10th

=== Prelude ===
Prior to the Battle of Pozières (23 July–3 September), 48th Division was engaged in pushing its line forward north and north-east of Ovillers. On 19 July, 1/5th Battalion went into the line north-east of the village, and the next day it was involved in a three-hour attack north-eastwards towards Pozières. The battalion suffered 115 casualties, but failed to gain any ground.

On 20 July, 1/6th Battalion relieved 1/4th Battalion north of Ovillers, and in the early hours of the next morning it attacked the German trenches 500 yards (460 m) north of the village. C Company carried its objective and inflicted heavy casualties when the Germans vainly tried to regain their trenches. A Company twice gained its objective, but was twice expelled from it. The leading platoons of B Company took numerous casualties from machine-guns on both flanks, and the company was unable to reach its objective. Losses to the 1/6th in this action were 11 killed and 92 wounded or missing. In a letter to his mother, now held by the Regimental Museum, Captain L. Cameron Nott, serving with 1/6th Battalion, gives a mournful roll-call of some of the many officers who fell during this period, amongst them Lieutenant Arthur Roughton Smith, to whom he had lent his tunic, who was wounded on 21 July,

Smith, poor fellow, has died of wounds. I passed him on his way down – though hit in seven places, his courage was wonderful. I asked him how he felt & he said with a smile "There is some lead in me which ought not to be there & I am afraid I have done in your tunic. I am awfully sorry".

=== Supporting the assault on Pozières ===
Actions by the territorial battalions of the Gloucestershire Regiment prior to and during the Battle of Pozières

The 1st Australian Division assault on Pozières began 00:30 on 23 July. In support on their left flank, 1/5th Battalion attacked north-eastwards from Ovillers along the road/rail link towards Pozières, with 4th Battalion Oxfordshire and Buckinghamshire Light Infantry on the Glosters' right. Companies A and C led the battalion, but were quickly spotted and halted by heavy machine-gun and artillery fire. B Company reinforced the assault companies and artillery was called in on the enemy, but the attack failed and at 03:30 the battalion was withdrawn, having lost 8 officers and 148 other ranks.

On the left of the 1/5th, 1/6th Battalion also attacked north-eastwards towards Pozières. The leading platoons of C and D Companies advanced to within 70 yards (64 m) of their objective, but were then cut down by machine-gun fire. The supporting troops of D Company could not get through the killing zone, and only six men actually reached the German trenches. All of the officers of C and D Companies became casualties, and only one officer of A Company remained unscathed. The attack had reduced A Company to 42 men, C Company to 29 and D company to 71. On the left of the 1/6th, 1/4th Battalion supported the assault with their own bombing attacks, but the defences were too strong, and the attacks were halted at 05:00 when it was learned that the 1/6th attack had failed. One MC and four DCMs were awarded to men of 1/6th Battalion, mostly for acts of gallantry in rescuing the wounded. (Note: 1/6th Battalion reported total casualties for the month of July, which combines losses suffered before and during the Battle of Pozières, as 8 officers killed and 11 wounded, plus 20 killed, 62 missing and 296 wounded amongst the other ranks.)

On the Australians' right flank, 10th Battalion was part of the 1st Division attack on the Switch Line, some 1.5 miles (2.4 km) east of Pozières. The attack was halted by heavy machine-gun fire from previously undetected positions in the long grass and shell craters behind the German line, although Lt. Brewis was awarded the MC for leading the capture of an enemy advanced post that allowed subsequent observation of the German lines. (Note: Sources do not give details of 10th Battalion casualties, though a search using the Commonwealth War Graves Commission Find War Dead facility for deaths incurred by 10th Battalion The Gloucestershire Regiment on 23 July 1916 yields 52 names.) Some 750 yards (690 m) to the right of the 10th, 8th Battalion was part of 19th Division's attack on the Intermediate Trench. It was stopped by heavy machine-gun fire from High Wood with the loss, in killed and wounded, of 14 officers, including Lieutenant-Colonel de Wiart with a gunshot wound to the neck, and 186 other ranks. CSM Fowles was awarded the MC for gallantry when he assumed command after the loss of all his officers.

Although 1st Battalion was not involved in any attack during the battle, on 24 July it relieved 2nd Battalion Royal Sussex Regiment in the line east of Pozières. The next day the Australians, having captured the village, were subjected to a heavy counter-attack, and flanking fire from the Lewis guns of the battalion helped to break it up. The battalion was itself subject to heavy artillery bombardment in this position until it was relieved on the 26th.

=== Attacks on the Intermediate Trench ===
On 30 July, 57th Brigade again attempted to take Intermediate Trench with an assault by all four battalions. The two right-hand battalions advanced close behind the barrage and succeeded in capturing their half of the objective, but on the left, 8th Battalion and 10th Worcesters were late to advance and were both forced back by machine-gun and sniper fire. In this attack 8th Battalion lost in killed and wounded of 14 officers – including, for the second time in a week, its commanding officer, Major Lord A.G. Thynne, who had taken over command on 24 July, wounded as he urged his men on – and 160 other ranks.

As the Australians pushed on from Pozières to attack Mouquet Farm, 10th Battalion was involved in two further attempts against the Intermediate Trench, on 17 and 19 August, but both attacks failed. (Note: Again the sources give no figures for casualties, though a search using the Commonwealth War Graves Commission Find War Dead facility for deaths incurred by the 10th Battalion The Gloucestershire Regiment 17–19 August 1916 yields 37 names.)

=== Subsequent operations by the territorials ===
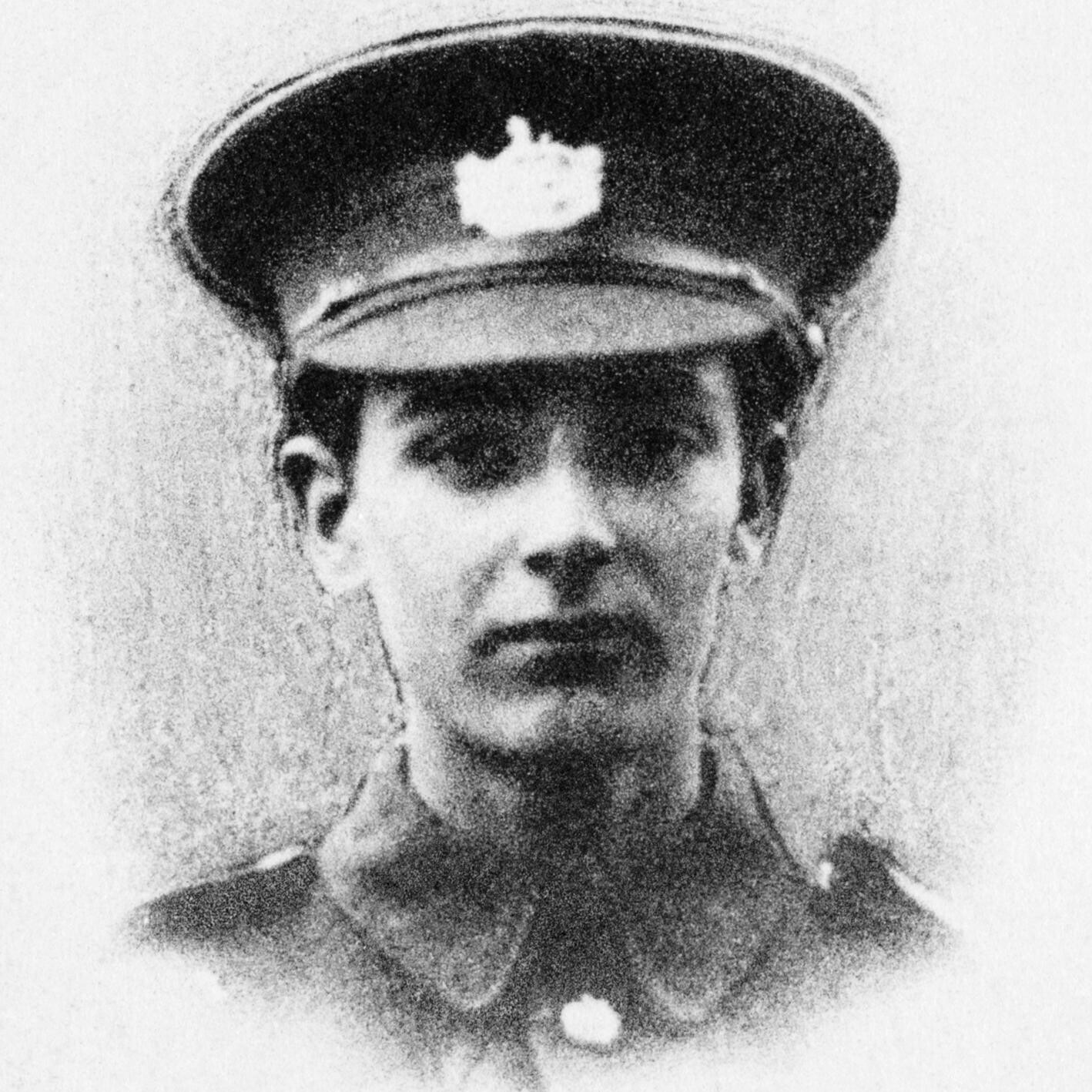
Pte Neale, D Company 1/5th Battalion. Reported missing 16 August 1916.

After a three-week rest the territorials returned briefly to the line north of Ovillers on the Australian left flank and continued to press northwards. On 13–14 August, 1/6th Battalion attacked from roughly the positions they had captured on 21 July. The battalion was relieved on 15 August by 1/4th Battalion, which attacked on 16 August with 1/5th Battalion also attacking on their left. All of these attacks were repulsed, with casualties to the 1/4th numbering some 74 all ranks, while the 1/5th lost 128 all ranks. By the end of 16 August all three territorial battalions were once again out of the line.

On 21 August, 1/4th Battalion relieved 11th Battalion Cheshire Regiment in the line south of the Leipzig Redoubt, preparatory to an assault on the redoubt. Just before 18:00, B and C Companies moved forward, and under cover of an artillery bombardment that commenced at 18:00 they launched their attack. They reached the German wire, and at 18:05, when the barrage lifted to the German second line, they occupied the first line against little opposition. At 18:10 the barrage lifted to the third line, allowing the Glosters to take the second line. Having thus reached their objective, A Company followed up and reinforced them. At 20:00 the next day the Germans began shelling the 1/4th positions, and from 22:00 they launched three separate counter-attacks, all of them repulsed. The C Company commander, Major Shellard, was awarded the DSO, and the B Company commander, Captain Wookey, was awarded the MC.

The 1/4th Battalion assault on the Leipzig Redoubt was supported on the right flank by 1/6th Battalion. The battalion had relieved 5th Warwicks on 20 August, and A Company pushed the line forward, but several attempts to continue the advance the next day failed. C Company, supported by D Company, took over from A Company on 21 August, and at 05:00 the next day a German attack scattered one platoon of C Company and forced the Glosters back to the trenches they had taken over from the Warwicks two days previously. By 17:00, D Company had regained most of the ground lost by C Company, sometimes at the point of a bayonet. Four attempts were then made to dislodge the Glosters, all of them repulsed, and in the early hours of 23 August a patrol found all enemy trenches to the battalion's front had been abandoned. Two MCs and three DCMs were awarded as a result of this action.

On 27 August, 1/5th Battalion launched the territorial's final attack of the Battle of Pozières alongside 1/4th Battalion Royal Berkshire Regiment. B and C Companies attacked across open ground up Nab Valley, south-west of Pole Trench, under cover of an artillery bombardment which some of the men of C Company ran into in their haste. Meanwhile, A Company advanced onto the objective via a communications trench, and was the only company to encounter any serious opposition. About 50 enemy were taken prisoner and an estimated 200 killed and wounded for the loss to the battalion of 6 officers and 108 other ranks. The MC was awarded to three men, and the DCM to one.

== High Wood ==
Battalions involved: 1st, 10th

High Wood, north east of Bazentin, was abandoned by the Germans on the first day of the Battle of Bazentin, but the British failure to occupy it allowed the Germans to return. The wood was subject to numerous subsequent attacks, but was not taken until 15 September.

1st Battalion spent a week in the line near High Wood at the end of August during which time it endured the most intense shelling it experienced in the whole war. After three days the trenches were practically obliterated, forcing the men into the shell holes in front of them, and by the time the battalion was relieved on 28 August it had lost 46 killed and 141 wounded. The battalion returned to the line in front of High Wood on 8 September, and at 18:00, with 2nd Battalion Welch Regiment on their right and 9th Battalion Black Watch on their left, attacked into the wood. One platoon of A Company was practically wiped out before the company reached the German second line, and on its right fierce fighting severely weakened B Company before it was eventually able to join A Company. Companies C and D following in support took many casualties, and only a few of these men made it to the objective unwounded. As it consolidated its gains the battalion continued to take casualties, and heavy shelling also took a toll of the wounded making their way back to the rear lines. Lacking reinforcement, the survivors were ordered to withdraw, and by 22:00 they were back in their original trenches, from which, at 03:00 on 9 September, they repulsed a German counter-attack. Casualties to the battalion in the action around High Wood were 5 officers killed and 8 wounded – amongst whom was the commanding officer Lieutenant-Colonel Pagan – and 84 other ranks killed and 122 wounded, leaving the battalion with just 4 officers and 96 other ranks fit for duty.

Later on 9 September, 10th Battalion was attached to 3rd Brigade and ordered to make another attempt on High Wood. The assaulting companies, C and D, were rushed into position with insufficient time to plan, and as soon as they entered the western edge of the wood they were subjected to heavy bombing and enfilade machine-gun fire and forced to fall back. The action cost the battalion 122 casualties.

== Battle of Guillemont ==
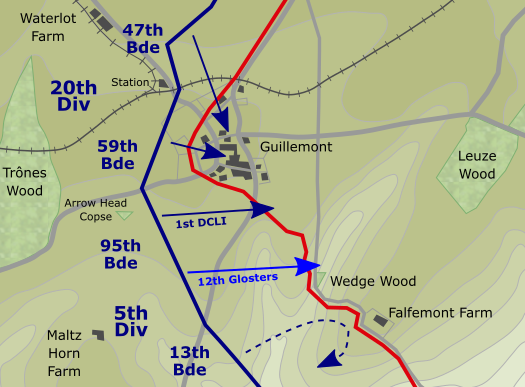
12th Battalion Gloucestershire Regiment at the Battle of Guillemont, 3 September 1916.

Battalions involved: 12th

The village of Guillemont lay on the British right flank, close to the boundary with the French Sixth Army. The British Fourth Army had advanced close to the village in mid July during the Battle of Bazentin, but although several attacks in July and August pushed the front line closer to the village, it remained in German hands until it finally fell to the British 20th Division on 3 September during the Battle of Guillemont (3–6 September).

12th Battalion had experienced its first significant combat of the war during the Somme offensive when, on 29 July, B and C Companies participated in an attack near Longueval, about 1 mile (1.6 km) north-west of Guillemont. On 3 September the battalion was in action again, alongside 1st Battalion Duke of Cornwall's Light Infantry, attacking on the right flank of 20th Division's assault on the village. The attack succeeded in occupying the German second line from Wedge Wood to the southeastern edge of Guillemont, but 13th Brigade's attack against Falfemont Farm on the Glosters' right had stalled, and enfilading fire from enemy machine-guns there accounted for 328 casualties amongst the 12th. The farm was eventually captured on 5 September, and on that day 12th Battalion pushed on to Leuze Wood, nearly 1 mile (1.6 km) east of Guillemont, completing an advance of 3,500 yards (3,200 m) by 95th Brigade during the battle. Eight awards of gallantry were awarded as a result of the battle; the MC to 2nd Lt. Fitzgerald for conspicuous gallantry in assuming command after all remaining officers of the four assaulting companies became casualties, and seven Military Medals (MM).

== Battle of Morval ==
Battalions involved: 12th

On the night of 6–7 September, 5th Division was relieved and brought back up to strength. It returned to the line between Ginchy and Morval on 18 September, in preparation for the Battle of Morval (25–28 September), and its 95th Brigade dug trenches on the newly captured ground immediately north of Bouleaux Wood. On their right, the 56th Division occupied Bouleaux Wood and the ground further south around the village of Combles.

On 25 September, 56th Division attacked from Bouleaux Wood towards Combles. On their left, 1st Battalion East Surrey Regiment and 1st Battalion Devonshire Regiment led 95th Brigade's attack towards Morval, and on their left was the 1st Cheshires of 15th Brigade. The East Surreys and Devonshires were supported by the Glosters' 12th Battalion and 2nd Battalion King's Own Scottish Borderers (KOSB). The 56th Division attack was held up by machine-gun fire from a railway embankment north of Combles, which also caught the East Surreys in their right flank and halted their progress. The Devonshires, meanwhile, had looped left and were attacking a strong-point on the Ginchy–Morval road. In the afternoon, 12th Glosters and 2nd KOSB pushed on and took the southern half of Morval, and just after 15:00 1st Cheshires rushed the northern half. The capture of Morval and the French capture of Fregicourt, east of Combles, had rendered the German position in Combles untenable, and the village was captured on 26 September.

== Operations on the Ancre ==
Battalions involved: 8th, 13th

The pioneers of 13th Battalion were in action on 3 September when C Company supported the 39th Division advance up the Ancre valley in the area of Beaumont Hamel, on the northern flank of the Somme offensive. During the Battle of the Ancre Heights they were called upon to construct a communication trenches; on 14 October after 118th Brigade had captured the northern face of the Schwaben Redoubt, and again on 21 October following a 116th Brigade attack on Stuff Trench. On 22 October, 19th Division moved to the Ancre sector to relieve the 25th Division, and two days later 8th Battalion moved into the front line around Stuff Redoubt. They were heavily shelled the next day, and on 26 October the commanding officer, Lt. Col. Carton de Wiart VC DSO, was again wounded.

On 13 November, the opening day of the Battle of the Ancre, the pioneers were involved in the repair of the Hamel–St. Pierre Divion road following an advance by 39th Division. At 06:10 on 18 November, the last day of the Battle of the Somme, 8th Battalion advanced through sleet with a company from 10th Battalion Royal Warwickshire Regiment across Battery Valley and into the south-western end of Grandcourt, though they were forced to abandon the village the next day. Casualties to the battalion numbered 12 officers and 283 other ranks. As a result of this action three MCs, three DCMs, and seven MMs were awarded.

== After the Somme ==
The Somme offensive ended with bad weather on 19 November. The British had seized a strip of territory approximately 25 miles (40 km) wide by 6 miles (9.7 km) deep, but their front line was still 3 miles (4.8 km) from Bapaume. The offensive had relieved the pressure on the French at Verdun, degraded the strength and morale of the German forces, and forged Britain's citizen army into a more formidable fighting force. Before the offensive had even ended, the Germans began construction on new defensive positions, the Hindenburg Line, 25 miles (40 km) to the rear, to which they started withdrawing in March 1917.

There are no casualty figures specific to the Somme for the regiment, but the Commonwealth War Graves Commission (CWGC) lists nearly 1800 deaths for Gloucestershire Regiment in France between 1 July and 18 November 1916. In addition to Lt-Col de Wiart's award of the VC, the DSO was awarded to two men of the regiment and the DCM to 29 for their actions during the offensive.

It had been agreed in November that the British Fourth Army would take over the French Sixth Army's positions between Péronne and Roye, south of the Somme, and by February 1917 the territorials of 1/4th and 1/6th Battalions were in the front line north of Barleux, with 1/5th Battalion in reserve at Flaucourt. To their right, 1st Division, with 1st and 10th Battalions, took up positions south of Barleux. 8th Battalion spent the rest of 1916 out of the line at Gézaincourt, Beauval and Bayencourt, with spells in the trenches around Hébuterne and Courcelles in January and February 1917. In early October, 12th Battalion went with the 5th Division to the First Army on the Bethune front, and in March 1917 they were transferred again, to the Canadian Corps on the Vimy front. In November, 13th Battalion went with 39th Division to Ypres. At the end of August, 14th Battalion went with 35th Division to the Third Army on the Arras front, and in February 1917 they were transferred again, to the Fourth Army to relieve the French 154th Division around Chaulnes and Chilly, over 8 miles (13 km) southwest of Barleux.
