= Gloucestershire Regiment in World War I =

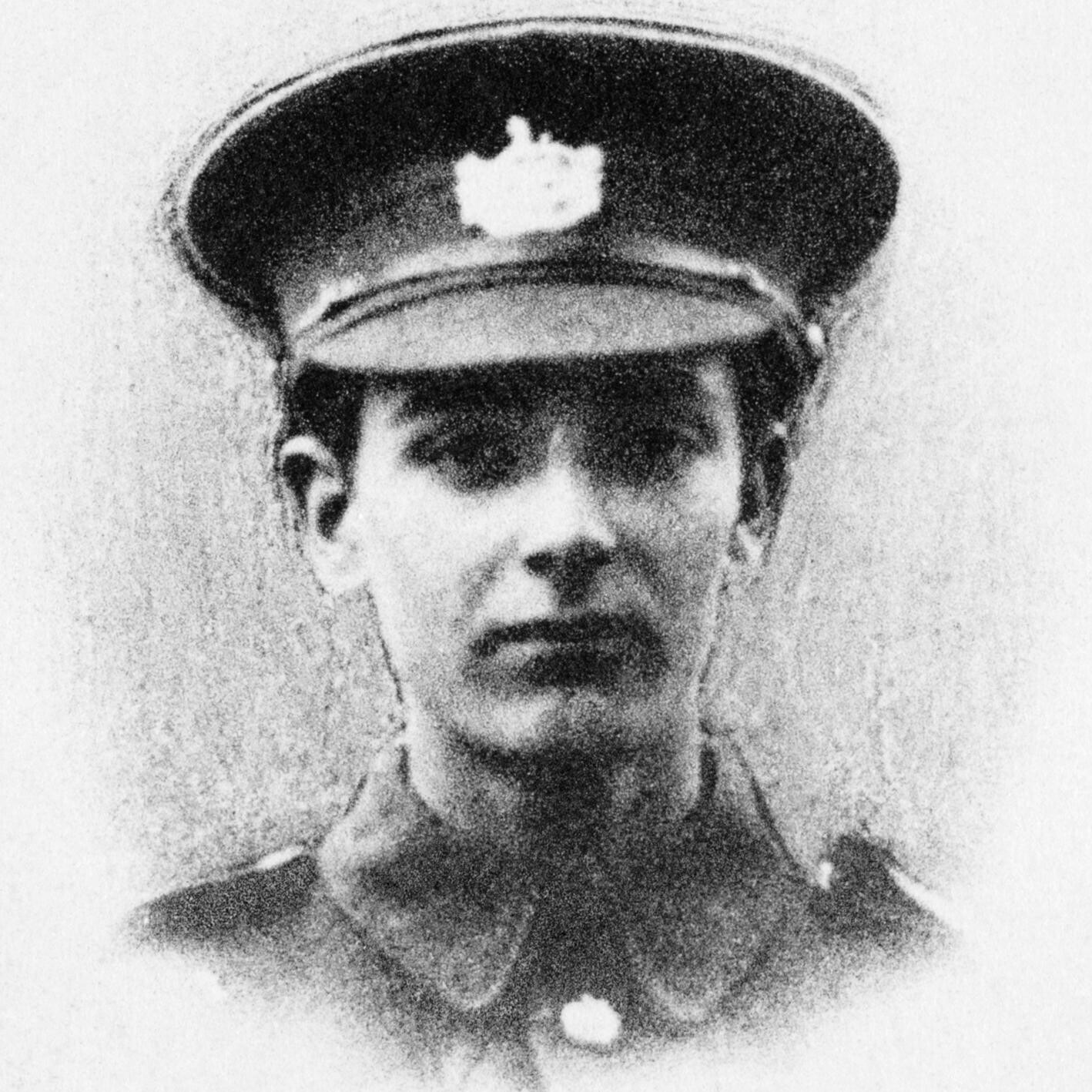
Private Frederick G. Neale, 13 Platoon, "D" Company, 1st/5th Battalion, Gloucestershire Regiment. Missing in action during the Battle of Pozières, 16 August 1916, and is commemorated on the Thiepval Memorial.

The Gloucestershire Regiment was a line infantry regiment of the British Army. Before World War I it comprised two regular battalions, two reserve battalions, and two territorial battalions. During the war an additional 18 battalions were raised. In total 16 battalions of the Gloucestershire Regiment saw active service during World War I; on the Western Front in France and Flanders, Italy, Gallipoli, Egypt, Mesopotamia, Persia, and Salonika.

== Background ==
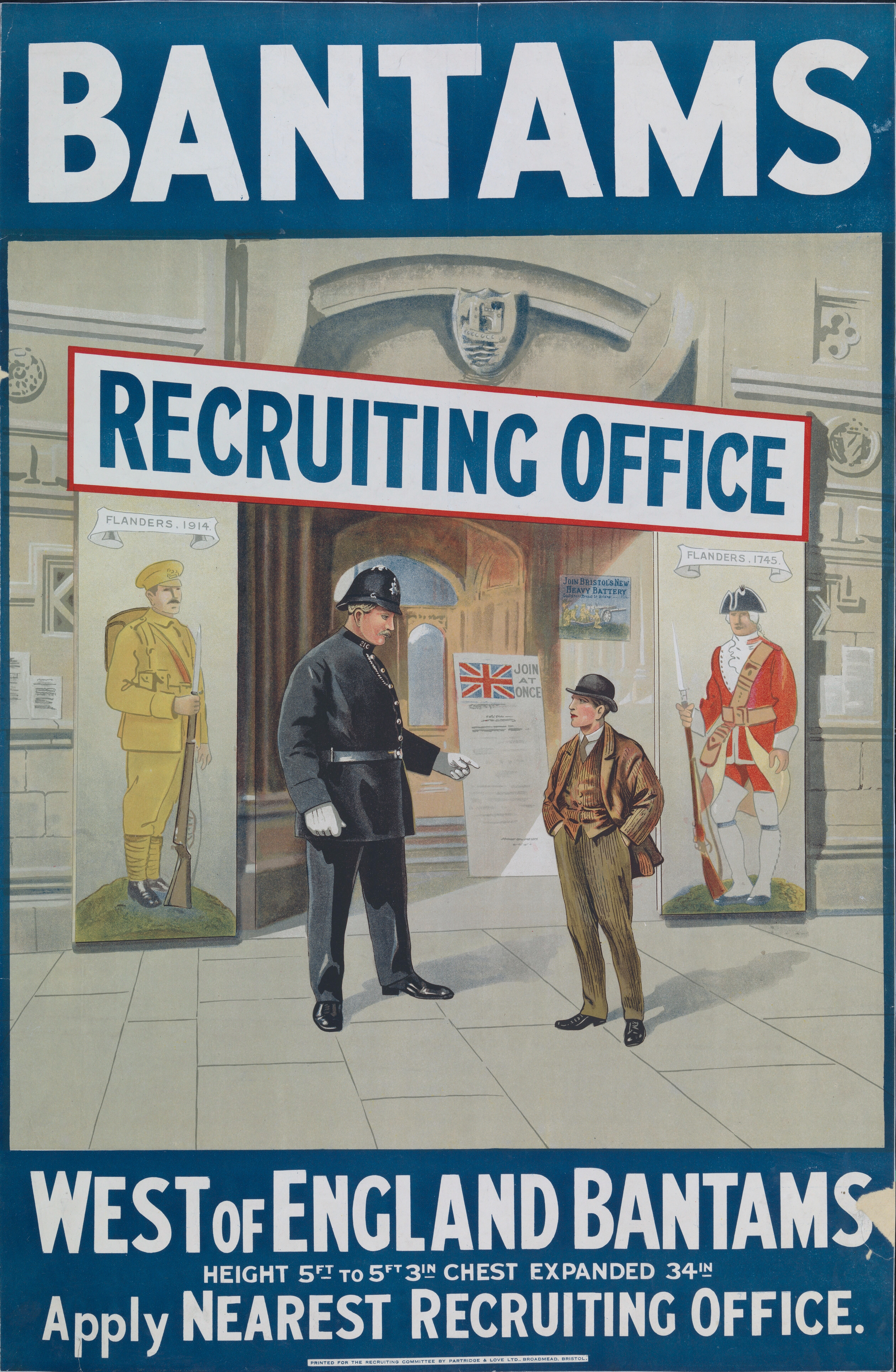
Recruiting poster for the 14th Battalion (West of England) – a Bantam battalion.

The Gloucestershire Regiment was formed as a result of the Childers Reforms of 1881 by the amalgamation of the 28th and the 61st Regiments, and was headquartered at Horfield Barracks in Bristol. The new regiment comprised two regular and four auxiliary battalions. The regiment was further restructured following the Territorial and Reserve Forces Act 1907 – part of the Haldane Reforms which converted the militia and volunteer auxiliary battalions into the Special Reserve and the Territorial Force – and at the outbreak of the First World War in 1914 the Gloucestershire Regiment comprised:

- 1st Battalion – assigned to the 3rd Infantry Brigade, 1st Infantry Division, British Expeditionary Force
- 2nd Battalion – deployed to Tianjin, China
- 3rd (Reserve) Battalion, Special Reserve – based at the regimental depot in Bristol
- 4th (City of Bristol) Battalion, Territorial Force – based at Queen's Road in Clifton and subsequently Old Market Street in Bristol
- 5th Battalion, Territorial Force – based at Brunswick Road in Gloucester (since demolished)
- 6th Battalion, Territorial Force – based at St Michael's Hill in Bristol (since demolished)

During the course of the war the regiment raised an additional 18 battalions. Each of the Territorial Force battalions volunteered for service overseas and raised a second battalion. The six territorial battalions were numbered 1/4th, 2/4th, 1/5th, 2/5th, 1/6th, and 2/6th. (Note: The Territorial Force was originally designed to replace the regular army in home defence when the latter was sent overseas. The territorials were under no obligation themselves to serve overseas, but could volunteer to do so, and when at the beginning of the war they did, second-line battalions were formed from the men who declined, or were too young or too old, to go. These battalions suffered from a lack of priority in equipment, and trained men were often transferred to the first-line battalions as replacements. As manpower shortages loomed, the Military Service Act 1916 introduced conscription and obliged all men of the Territorial Force either to accept military service overseas with their battalion or to resign and be conscripted anyway.) The Territorials also raised a 3rd battalion each in 1915 as home-based reserves, though in 1916 these were merged to form the 4th (City of Bristol) Reserve Battalion. Another home-based territorial battalion, the 17th, was raised in 1917. Additionally, as volunteers answered Kitchener's call to arms, ten New Army battalions, the 7th to the 16th, were added to the regiment's establishment between 1914 and 1916. Finally, the 18th battalion was raised in 1918 from a cadre of the 5th Battalion, the Ox & Bucks Light Infantry. Of the 24 Gloucestershire Regiment battalions that existed during the war, 16 were to see active service; on the western front in France and Flanders, Italy, Gallipoli, Egypt, Mesopotamia, Persia, and Salonika. (Note: At full establishment a standard British infantry battalion of the time numbered a little over 1000 men, organised into four companies lettered A – D. Each company was some 227 men strong and commanded by a major or a captain, with a captain as second-in-command, and was further sub-divided into four platoons. Each platoon was some 53 men strong and commanded by a lieutenant or second-lieutenant. Four battalions together formed a brigade, and a division comprised three brigades.)

=== Active service battalions and their brigade/division attachments ===
Battalion	Brigade	Division	Theatre	Deployed
1st	3rd	1st	Western front	August 1915
2nd	81st 82nd (November 1916)	27th	Western front Salonika	December 1914; December 1915
1/4th (City of Bristol)	144th (Gloucester & Worcester)	48th (South Midland)	Western front Italy	March 1915; November 1917
1/5th	145th (South Midland); 75th (September 1918)	48th (South Midland); 25th	Western front Italy; Western Front	March 1915; November 1917; September 1918
1/6th	144th	48th (South Midland)	Western front Italy	March 1915; November 1917
2/4th (City of Bristol)	183rd (2nd Gloucester & Worcester)	61st (2nd South Midland)	Western front	May 1916
2/5th	184th (2nd South Midland)	61st (2nd South Midland)	Western front	May 1916
2/6th	183rd	61st (2nd South Midland)	Western front	May 1916
7th	39th	13th (Western)	Gallipoli; Egypt; Mesopotamia; Persia	June 1915; January 1916; March 1916; July 1918
8th	57th	19th (Western)	Western front	July 1915
9th	78th	26th	Salonika	November 1915
10th	1st	1st	Western front	August 1915
12th (Bristol's Own)	95th	5th	Western front Italy; Western front	December 1915; December 1917; April 1918
13th (Forest of Dean)	Divisional pioneers	39th	Western front	March 1916
14th (West of England)	105th	35th (Bantam)	Western front	January 1916
18th	49th	16th	Western front	August 1918

== Western Front ==
On the Western Front, hostilities commenced 2 August 1914 with the German invasion of Luxembourg and Belgium, designed to envelop Paris in a right sweep that avoided the most heavily defended French territory. The French, whose main effort was directed towards Alsace and Lorraine as a prelude to an invasion of Germany, were thrown onto the defensive on their left flank, which included one cavalry and four infantry divisions of the British Expeditionary Force. At the end of a two-week retreat from Mons the French managed to stop the Germans on the outskirts of Paris in the First Battle of the Marne. German forces retreated to the River Aisne and dug in, the first act of trench warfare that was to dominate the war.

The Gloucestershire Regiment suffered its first casualties of the war on 26 August 1914 during the retreat from Mons, when 1st Battalion fought a rearguard action in the vicinity of Landrecies, 25 miles (40 km) southwest of Mons, losing 5 killed and 30 wounded before retiring with the rest of the 1st Division. By the time that the retreat ended the battalion had covered 200 miles in just 13 days. As the Germans fell back to the Aisne, the Anglo-French forces went over to the offensive, and on 13 September 1st Division began crossing the river, their objective being the Chemin des Dames ridge in the area of Cerny and Courtecon. The next day a German attack pushed back the division's 2nd Brigade, and the Glosters' B and C Companies covered the retreat of the now exposed 1st Brigade. For their actions, 2nd Lieutenant Watkins of C Company was awarded the Military Cross (MC), and Privates Orr and Law of D Company were awarded the Distinguished Conduct Medal (DCM), the first such awards to the regiment in the war. By the time the BEF moved to Ypres in mid-October, total casualties to the battalion in the fighting along the river Aisne had risen to 150 officers and men.

=== First Battle of Ypres ===
Battalions involved: 1st

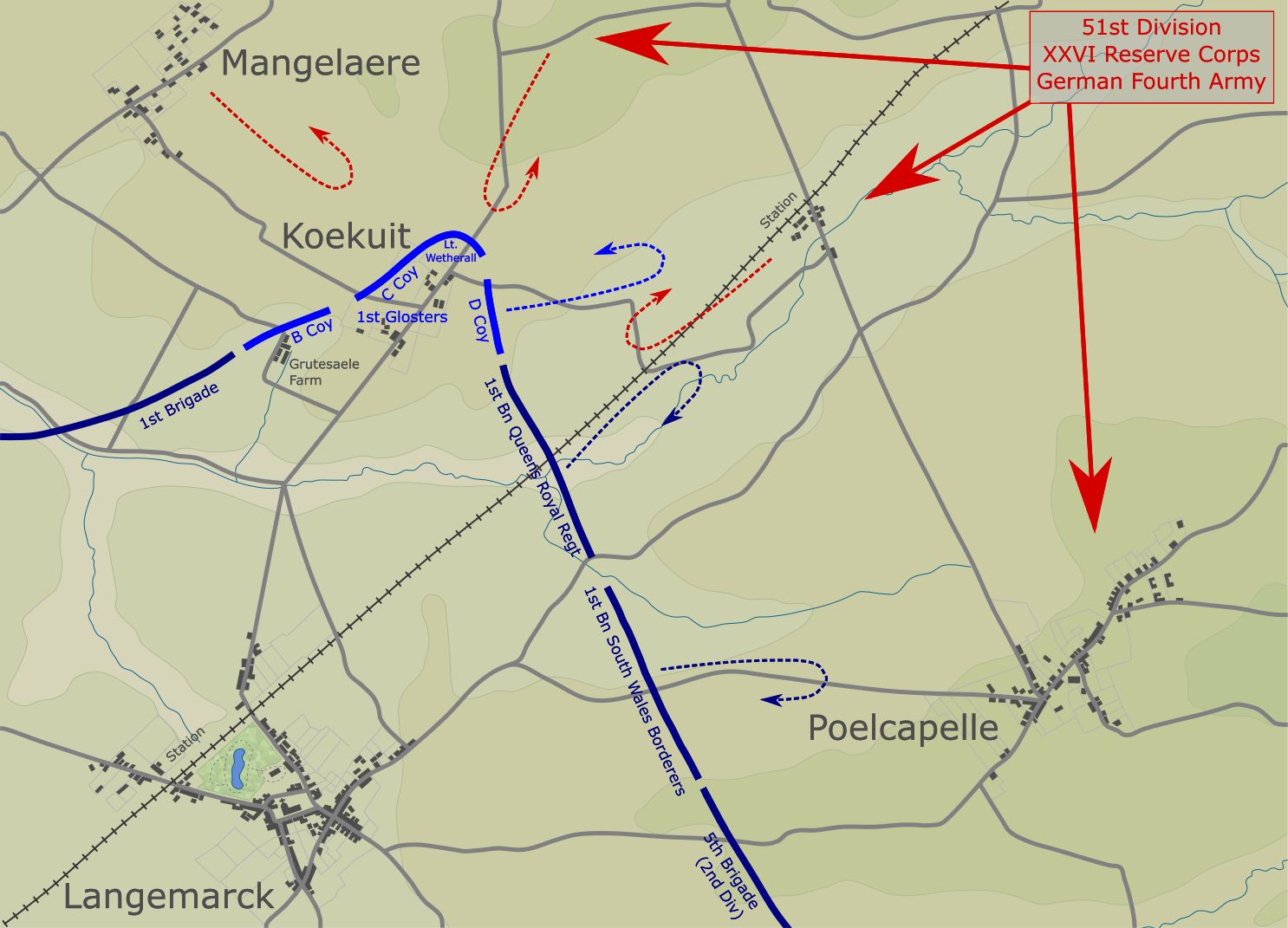
1st Battalion at the Battle of Langemarck, 21 October 1914

With stalemate on the Aisne, the opposing armies attempted to outflank each other in the Race to the Sea, which ended 8 October with the French Tenth Army facing the German Sixth Army close to the coast in the area of St. Omer. Between 11 and 18 October the BEF moved from the Aisne and slotted into the allied left flank in the area between St. Omer and Bethune, on the right of the French Tenth Army. The allies planned to attack northeast on a line between Ypres and Nieuport, drive the weakened German III Corps against the coast, and wheel right to take the rest of the German Sixth Army in the flank and rear. They had not discovered, however, that behind III Corps the Germans had assembled the Fourth Army, consisting of four fresh corps, and were themselves planning to attack, and the opposing forces clashed in the First Battle of Ypres (19 October - 22 November 1914).

On 21 October, during the Battle of Langemarck, the opening engagement of the First Battle of Ypres, 1st Battalion occupied a salient around the village of Langemarck, nearly 5 miles (8.0 km) north of Ypres. Elements of C Company commanded by Lieutenant Wetherall, defending the tip of the salient at the hamlet of Koekuit, were particularly hard pressed, beating back repeated attacks until ordered to withdraw after dark. For his stubborn defence Wetherall was awarded the MC.

Two days later three platoons led by Captain Rising conducted a "...stout defence..." against a "...determined attack by the enemy..." on the northern outskirts of Langemarck. Their situation had become critical when the 1st Battalion Coldstream Guards was forced back, exposing the Glosters' left flank. Two of the three platoon leaders were killed and the third wounded, and with 51 casualties amongst the other ranks, Rising's group came close to being overwhelmed. For their actions Captain Rising was awarded the Distinguished Service Order (DSO), Lieutenant Baxter (4 Platoon commander) was awarded the MC, and four men were awarded the DCM. 1st Division was relieved overnight on 24–25 October, and 1st Glosters marched into reserve positions behind the lines near Gheluvelt, some 5 miles (8.0 km) east of Ypres early on the 25th.

On 28 October 1st Battalion was notified that it may be called on as a reserve by 1st Brigade. Accordingly, a platoon and Lt. Duncan's machine-gun section went into the line alongside the Coldstream Guards at the Kruiseecke crossroads on the Menin road 1 mile (1.6 km) south east of Gheluvelt. At 06:30 the next day Lt.Duncan appeared at battalion HQ to report the loss of his guns; a large German force had emerged from the early morning mist and practically annihilated the Guards battalions. A counter-attack towards Gheluvelt by 1st Battalion broke down into a series of disconnected company actions. C Company advanced into the chateau northeast of the village, but took several casualties early on and ceased to exist as a company when the few officers remaining became separated. A Company advanced close behind C Company and linked up with the remnants of the Black Watch and Scots Guards, but a mixed group of 120 Glosters and Guards were outflanked and forced to surrender. D Company advanced to within 300 yards (270 m) of the original front line on the Kruiseecke road, where they helped rally the remnants of the Guards there, but found themselves otherwise alone facing enemy both to the north and east. Outnumbered, they nevertheless stood their ground until the remainder of A Company arrived to their rear, allowing them to fall back 300 yards (270 m). B Company had followed behind D, then turned right to advance on Kruiseecke, but were stopped 800 yards (730 m) east of Gheluvelt. In the afternoon 3rd Brigade came up and relieved the surviving Glosters, though a party of some 50 or 60 men under B Company commander Captain Blunt remained in positions in front of the line until the evening. The battalion had lost 7 officers and 160 other ranks.

As the battle raged on around Ypres the Glosters were repeatedly called upon to participate in costly counter-attacks: on 31 October and 2 November around Gheluvelt; on 6 November towards Zwarteleen some 2 miles (3.2 km) southeast of Ypres; and on 11 November in the Battle of Nonne Bosschen. Casualties had at one stage reduced the battalion to 200 – 300 all ranks, around a quarter of its original strength. Other units fared little better, with 3rd Brigade having been reduced to little more than battalion strength. By mid-November the German attempt to capture Ypres exhausted itself, and 1st Battalion was taken out of the line to be rested and brought back up to strength. The Glosters had a month previously marched towards Langemarck with 25 officers and 970 other ranks. Of that number, just 2 officers and not more than 100 men had survived the First Battle of Ypres.

=== Winter 1914-1915 ===
On 20 December the Germans attacked the Indian Corps around the village of Givenchy, and 1st Division received orders to assist in its defence. After an overnight march of more than 20 miles (32 km) the division arrived in the area on the afternoon of the next day, but the village had fallen and the division was ordered to counter-attack. The Glosters took up positions around Le Plantin, south of Festubert. On their right was 1st Brigade, opposite Givenchy, and on their left, in Festubert, was 1st Battalion South Wales Borderers. The counter-attack, which began at 15:05, was made over water-logged terrain which clogged the rifles with mud, and was immediately subject to heavy artillery and rifle fire. The Glosters advanced 500 yards (460 m) with three companies forward and the fourth in support, but lost touch with both Borderers and Guards. The support company was sent to try and find the Guards, without success, and the 2nd Battalion Welch Regiment was ordered into the gap between the Glosters and the Borderers. By nightfall 1st Division had retaken the ground lost the previous day, except for a small pocket in front of Festubert. A further attack the next day was cancelled, and the Glosters remained in the trenches for rest of the month in appalling conditions. Casualties to the battalion this day numbered 7 officers and 158 other ranks.

1st Battalion returned to the trenches around Givenchy 12 January. They endured snow and frost, and when a thaw set in the water damaged the parapets, at one stage making it necessary to sap forward and dig new trenches in front of the original line. On 25 January A and D Companies were in the front line, with B Company in local reserve and C Company in brigade reserve, when the Germans launched an attack. Although the Glosters stopped many in front of their trenches, some 60 enemy succeeded in infiltrating into Givenchy, behind the Glosters' positions. In echoes of the regiment's stand at the Battle of Alexandria in 1801, D Company fought for a while back to back until the enemy was eliminated in a counter-attack by 1st Battalion Black Watch. By nightfall the situation was stabilised, and all battalions of the brigade were congratulated on their successful defence by the commander-in-chief and corps commander. The battalion lost 4 officers and 36 other ranks in the fighting, and two MCs and three DCMs were awarded.

=== Second Battle of Ypres ===
Battalions involved: 2nd

"I can go on taking the damned hill as often as you want, but I cannot hold it"

— Captain Fane, B Company, 2nd Battalion

On 22 April the Germans launched their only offensive of 1915, the Second Battle of Ypres (22 April–25 May 1915), with a gas attack on the salient north of Ypres. By early May they had pushed back the French and Canadians defending the north and northeast, and forced the allies into a general withdrawal to shorten their lines. The third engagement of the battle, the Battle of Frezenberg Ridge, began 8 May when three Germans Corps attacked the salient in an arc across the Menin road from northeast to southeast. The British 27th Division held the line astride the Menin road, and the Gloster's 2nd Battalion, numbering over 800 men of all ranks, were in the line on the eastern edge of Sanctuary Wood, south of the road.

On 9 May the enemy succeeded in occupying part of the forward trench line held by 2nd Battalion. Some 30 men of B Company were cut off, and two failed attempts to retake the trenches could not rescue them. The survivors eventually managed the perilous journey back to the main line after dark, on a day which cost the battalion 5 officers (including the battalion commander) and 140 men. In the early hours of 12 May Captain Vicary conducted a lone reconnaissance of a small hill that overlooked the British lines and which had been lost the previous day. Finding his route back blocked by the enemy he made a dash for it, only to trip over a wounded German officer, whom he then dragged back to the British lines. Later that day B Company twice took the hill, both times being forced back by heavy artillery fire which cost it some 30 casualties. The Battle of Frezenberg Ridge drew to a close on 13 May, and 2nd Battalion was taken out of the line when 81st Brigade was relieved. On 20 May they were inspected by the BEF commander, Field Marshall Sir John French, who told them "Your Colours have many famous names emblazoned on them, but none will be more famous or more well deserved than that of the Second Battle of Ypres". The battle had reduced the battalion's strength to about 550 all ranks.

=== Battle of Aubers Ridge ===
Battalions involved: 1st

If 9 May 1915 was a severe test for 2nd Battalion, the day went no better for 1st Battalion in the Battle of Aubers Ridge (9 May 1915). In this battle the British First Army attacked in the area of Neuve Chapelle in support of the French Tenth Army offensive to the south (the Second Battle of Artois). The first British objective was the line Rue de Marais - Lorgies - Fromelles, and 1st Division's 3rd Brigade was in the line at Richebourg L'Avoue, southwest of Neuve Chapelle. The Gloster's 1st Battalion was assigned to the reserve and tasked with continuing the advance to Rue de Marais once the assaulting battalions had taken their objectives.

At 05:30 3rd Brigade's initial assault, by 2nd Battalion Royal Munster Fusiliers and 2nd Battalion Welch Regiment, was cut down as the men left their trenches and failed to take the objective. A poorly coordinated follow-up attack at 07:00 by 1st Glosters and 1st Battalion South Wales Borderers fared even worse, advancing at most 50 yards (46 m) and serving only to add to the dead and wounded lying in no-man's land before being recalled. At 16:00, following a barrage as ineffective in softening up the German defences as the first two, the Glosters and Borderers launched a third attack. The enemy did not even take shelter, but lined their parapets to shoot down the British in an attack that reached no further than the enemy wire. 1st Battalion sustained 264 casualties this day - 11 officers and 253 other ranks. The heaviest losses were suffered by D Company which, in the final attack, lost all its officers, most of its NCOs, and about 90 men. The attack was an unmitigated disaster for the British. It resulted in 12,000 casualties for no territorial gain, was of doubtful benefit to the French, and the inadequacy of the British artillery precipitated a political crisis in the UK.

=== Battle of Loos ===
Battalions involved: 1st, 10th

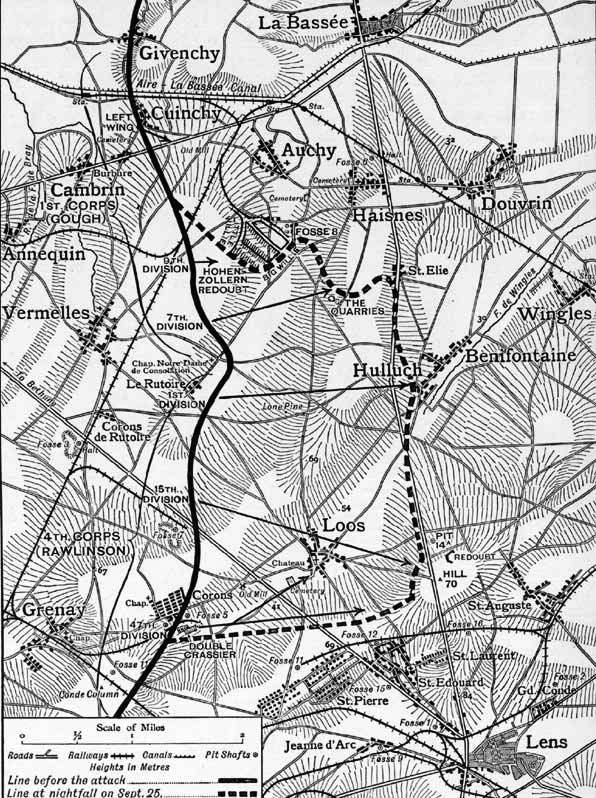
Battle of Loos

In the Battle of Loos (25 September–8 October 1915) the British First Army attacked between Grenay and Givenchy in support of the French Tenth Army attack further south against Vimy (the Third Battle of Artois). 1st Division was at Le Rutoire, in the middle of the line, and was tasked with the sector running from Northern Sap to the Hulluch road. The division's assaulting brigades were the 1st - where the two Guards battalions had in August been replaced by 10th Battalion Gloucestershire Regiment and 8th Battalion Royal Berkshire Regiment - and 2nd, with 3rd Brigade in divisional reserve 1,000 yards (910 m) behind the line.

In the assault, 2nd Brigade was held up by heavy German fire and failed to reach the objective, but on their left 1st Brigade, led by 10th Glosters and 8th Berkshires, fought its way across 400 yards (370 m) of no-man's land. The Glosters' progress was slowed in many places by uncut wire, and one company lost all its officers before it was able to cut its way through. Amongst numerous acts of heroism was that of Private Ingles, who rushed the German parapet alone and kept the defenders heads down while the rest of his unit got through the wire. The two battalions took heavy casualties, the Glosters alone losing 459 men, but succeeded in taking the first line of German trenches beyond Bois Carré, earning the praise of Field Marshal Sir John French. A letter home from an unnamed Lance-Corporal of the 10th mentions the gallantry displayed that day, and hints at the price paid:

My word, as soon as the order was given the Gloucesters were out and over the parapet and soon doing great havoc among the Germans. About 400 yards separated us from the German first line; and I am sorry to say we lost a lot of gallant men getting there...

In the afternoon 1st Battalion was ordered to make a flanking attack on the Germans who were still holding up 2nd Brigade's advance, but the enemy surrendered before the Glosters could get into position, and the battalion advanced instead to Bois Hugo, in the south east corner of the salient now formed by the British attack. The following morning they were relieved by the 8th Royal Lincolnshire Regiment, but the handover took too long; as dawn broke B and D Companies began to take casualties, and the machine-gun section had to be left behind. 1st Battalion returned to the area on 5 October when they occupied the trenches in a chalk pit just behind Bois Hugo, now in enemy hands. On 8 October they took the brunt of an enemy counter-attack there that was estimated at six battalions, which, with support from the artillery of 15th Division, was quickly broken up. The battalion lost about 130 men this day, but "...had a good fight; all ranks were overjoyed when the time came to meet the attackers with the bullet, thus to get their own back, not only for the shelling that they had endured earlier in the day, but also for the never-forgotten 9th of May". The Battle of Loos ended on 13 October, and in total accounted for 324 casualties of all ranks in 1st Battalion.

=== Battle of the Boar's Head ===
Battalions involved: 13th

Before dawn on 30 June, during the Battle of the Boar's Head (30 June 1916), the pioneers of 13th Battalion supported the 116th Brigade attack on a German salient south of Neuve Chapelle known as the Boar's Head. Their task was to dig communications trenches behind the advancing infantry. Due to the considerable troop movement and the failure of the infantry to achieve their main objective only B Company succeeded in reaching the German parapet. On several occasions the men of this company were forced to stop digging in order to defend themselves against German attacks, and for his actions Sgt. Tresise, who assumed command after both officers became casualties, was awarded the DCM. The battalion suffered 61 casualties.

=== Battle of the Somme ===
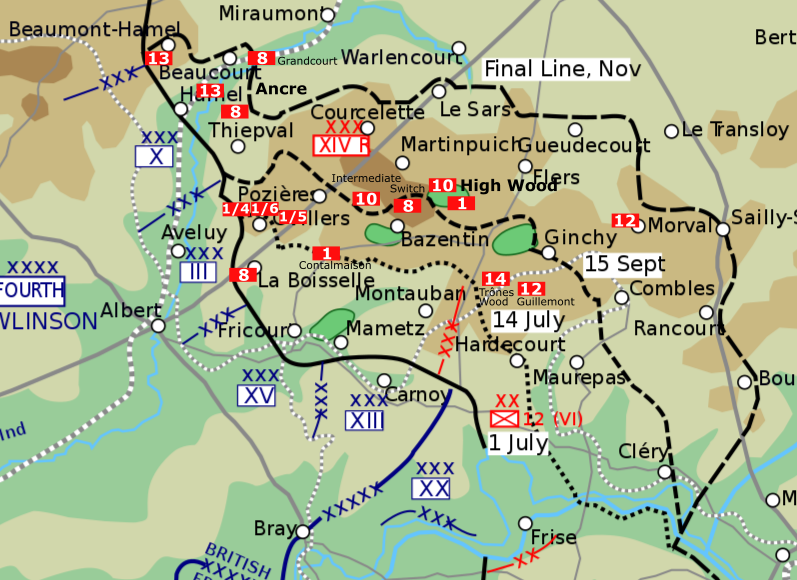
Overview of the locations where each battalion fought during the Battle of the Somme

Battalions involved: 1st, 1/4th, 1/5th, 1/6th, 8th, 10th, 12th, 13th, 14th

The Battle of the Somme (1 July – 18 November 1916) was part of a coordinated allied effort to overwhelm the Austro-German defences that had been agreed at the Chantilly Conferences of 1915. Up until the battle, the Somme had been a comparatively quiet sector, allowing the German Second Army ample time to prepare a defence in depth consisting of wide belts of wire, trenches, fortified villages and deep dug-outs. General Rawlinson, commanding the Fourth Army which would do most of the fighting, adopted a 'bite and hold' approach based on artillery bombardment and limited tactical advances, and the Somme offensive became a succession of battles and a lengthy war of attrition in which nine battalions of the Gloucestershire Regiment saw action.

==== Battle of Albert ====
On the third day of the Battle of Albert (1–13 July 1916), the opening engagement of the offensive, 57th Brigade attacked from the west and north of La Boiselle and then entered the village. When a German counter-attack pushed the British from the east end of the village and killed or wounded all the other 57th Brigade commanders, the commander of 8th Battalion Gloucestershire Regiment, Lieutenant-Colonel Adrian Carton de Wiart, assumed control of their commands. The village was finally captured on 4 July, and 8th Battalion was relieved the next day, having lost 6 officers killed, 14 wounded and 282 other ranks killed, wounded or missing. For his actions in averting a serious reverse at La Boisselle Lieutenant-Colonel de Wiart was awarded the Victoria Cross (VC), which he credited to the 8th, "for every man in the Battalion has done as much as I have".

==== Battle of Bazentin ====
On 16 July, during the Battle of Bazentin (14–17 July), the Glosters' 1st Battalion was part of the 3rd Brigade advance from Contalmaison in an intricate night attack which occupied the German front-line and support trenches northwest of Bazentin-le-Petit Wood. The attack cost the battalion three killed and 25 wounded. The same day, the regiment's three front-line territorial battalions moved into the line west of Ovillers, 2.5 miles (4.0 km) to the west of Bazentin-le-Petit. Alongside 1/7th Battalion Worcestershire Regiment, 1/4th Battalion fought for two days to capture first the German trenches west and northwest of Ovillers and then, along with troops of the 25th Division who were attacking from the south, the village itself. The fighting cost the battalion 275 men. 1/5th and 1/6th Battalions were in action between 19 and 23 July, making local attacks against strongpoints to the north and northeast. These actions were costly affairs and in just one example on 21 July 1/6th Battalion lost 3 officers and 101 other ranks.

On 14 July 18th Division had captured Trônes Wood, some 2.5 miles (4.0 km) southeast of Bazentin le Petit Wood, and four days later the bantam 35th Division relieved it. The Glosters' 14th Battalion went into the line at the northern end of the wood, and on 19 July it suffered 107 casualties.

==== Battle of Fromelles ====
The Battle of Fromelles (19–20 July) was not part of the Somme offensive, but was designed to draw German troops away from there. The Glosters' 2/4th and 2/6th were the assault battalions of 183rd Brigade, in the centre of 61st Division's front, and J.D.Wyatt, a company commander in the 2/4th, witnessed the moment the Glosters commenced their assault on 19 July:

Attacking Companies had started to go over the parapet when the bombardment lifted and were met immediately by a very heavy machine gun fire. The leading platoons were practically wiped out at once and no one could get any further. The other Regiments on our flanks got it worse if anything.

The same inadequate artillery preparation that plagued 1st Battalion's attack at Aubers Ridge the previous year resulted in the same futile losses against strong defences. Casualties to 2/4th Battalion numbered 7 of its 20 officers and 152 of the 550 other ranks that formed up at the start of the battle, while of the 20 officers and 600 men of the 2/6th, 13 officers and 164 men were lost.

Actions by the territorial battalions of the Gloucestershire Regiment during the Battle of Pozières

==== Battle of Pozières ====
On the first day of the Battle of Pozières (23 July–3 September), the Glosters of 1/5th and 1/6th Battalions made supporting attacks against the German trenches about 1 mile (1.6 km) to the west. At the same time, about 1.5 miles (2.4 km) to the east of the village, 10th Battalion attacked the German trenches known as the Switch Line. Some 750 yards (690 m) to the right of the 10th, 8th Battalion attacked the Intermediate Trench which ran south of the Switch Line. All of these attacks were repulsed with heavy casualties. 1/5th Battalion lost 8 officers and 148 other ranks, while 8th Battalion lost 14 officers, including Lieutenant-Colonel de Wiart with a gunshot wound to the neck, and 186 other ranks.

8th Battalion was back in action on 30 July in another attack on the Intermediate Trench, which also failed, and for the second time in a week the battalion lost its commanding officer when Major Lord A.G. Thynne, who had taken over command on 24 July, was wounded. On 17 and 19 August, 10th Battalion made two further unsuccessful attempts against the Intermediate Trench

On 21 August an attack by 1/4th Battalion succeeded in occupying the first two lines of the Leipzig Redoubt, just under 2 miles (3.2 km) west of Pozières. On the 1/4th's right, 1/6th Battalion was engaged in two days of fierce fighting before finally subduing the enemy and securing the flank on the morning of 23 July. The territorial's final action in the Battle of Pozières was on 27 August, when 1/5th Battalion made a successful assault near Pole Trench in Nab valley, to the east of the Leipzig Redoubt. The battalion captured some 50 prisoners and inflicted an estimated 200 casualties on the enemy for the loss of 6 officers and 98 other ranks.

==== High Wood ====
1st Battalion spent a week in the line near High Wood at the end of August, during which time it endured the most intense shelling it experienced in the whole war. After three days the trenches were practically obliterated, forcing the men into the shell holes in front of them, and by the time the battalion was relieved on 28 August it had lost 46 killed and 141 wounded. On 8 September the battalion joined the 2nd Welch and 9th Black Watch in an attack which carried the German second line in High Wood, but a lack of reinforcements forced them to withdraw. The attack cost 1st Battalion 3 officers (amongst them the commanding officer Lieutenant-Colonel Pagan), of whom 5 were killed, and 206 other ranks, of whom 84 were killed, leaving the battalion with just 4 officers and 96 other ranks fit for duty. The next day 10th Battalion suffered 122 casualties in a failed attack through the northwest corner of the wood.

==== Battle of Guillemont ====
On 3 September, during the Battle of Guillemont (3–6 September), 12th Battalion lost 328 men in an attack that succeeded in occupying the German second line from Wedge Wood to the southeastern edge of Guillemont. After the village was captured the battalion pushed on to Leuze Wood, nearly 1 mile (1.6 km) east of Guillemont, completing an advance of 3,500 yards (3,200 m) by 95th Brigade during the battle. The battalion was in action again during the Battle of Morval (25–28 September) when, along with 2nd Battalion King's Own Scottish Borderers, it captured the southern half of Morval.

==== Operations on the Ancre ====
The pioneers of 13th Battalion supported 39th Division in the Ancre sector on the northern flank of the Somme offensive, and were active in the Battle of the Ancre Heights (1 October–11 November) and the Battle of the Ancre (13–18 November). 8th Battalion was also active on the Ancre when 19th Division relieved 25th Division, and on 26 October the commanding officer, Lt. Col. Carton de Wiart VC DSO, was again wounded. On 18 November, the last day of the Battle of the Somme, the battalion advanced with a company from 10th Royal Warwickshire Regiment into the south-western end of the village of Grandcourt, though they were forced to abandon the village the next day. Casualties to the 8th Battalion in this action numbered 12 officers and 283 other ranks.

=== Winter 1916-1917 ===
It had been agreed in November that the British Fourth Army would take over the French Sixth Army's positions between Peronne and Roye south of the Somme, and by February 1917 the territorials of 1/4th and 1/6th were in the front line north of Barleux, with 1/5th in reserve at Flaucourt. To their right, 1st Division, with 1st and 10th Battalions, took up positions south of Barleux. In November, 61st Division was transferred to the Fifth Army, and the 2nd line territorials moved into positions on the Ancre around Grandcourt, Thiepval and Aveluy. 8th Battalion spent the rest of 1916 out of the line at Gézaincourt, Beauval, and Bayencourt, with spells in the trenches around Hébuterne and Courcelles in January and February 1917. In early October, 12th Battalion went with the 5th Division to the First Army on the Bethune front, and in March 1917 they were transferred again, to the Canadian Corps on the Vimy front. In November, 13th Battalion went with the 39th Division to Ypres. At the end of August, 14th Battalion went with 35th Division to the Third Army on the Arras front, and in February 1917 they were transferred again, to the Fourth Army to relieve the French 154th Division around Chaulnes and Chilly, over 8 miles (13 km) southwest of Barleux.

=== German withdrawal to the Hindenburg Line ===
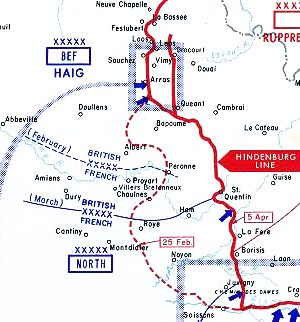
German withdrawal to Hindenburg Line

Over the winter the German high command decided to evacuate the Bapaume and Noyan salients created by the Battle of the Somme and withdraw to a more defensible line. The Hindenburg Line ran southwest from the River Scarpe near Arras to San Quentin then south to the River Aisne east of Soissons. British operations on the Ancre in February forced an early retirement there, but the main withdrawal began 16 March 1917, preceded by a week of laying waste to the territory being abandoned.
