= 6th Battalion, Gloucestershire Regiment =

3rd Volunteer Battalion, Gloucestershire Regiment 6th Battalion, Gloucestershire Regiment
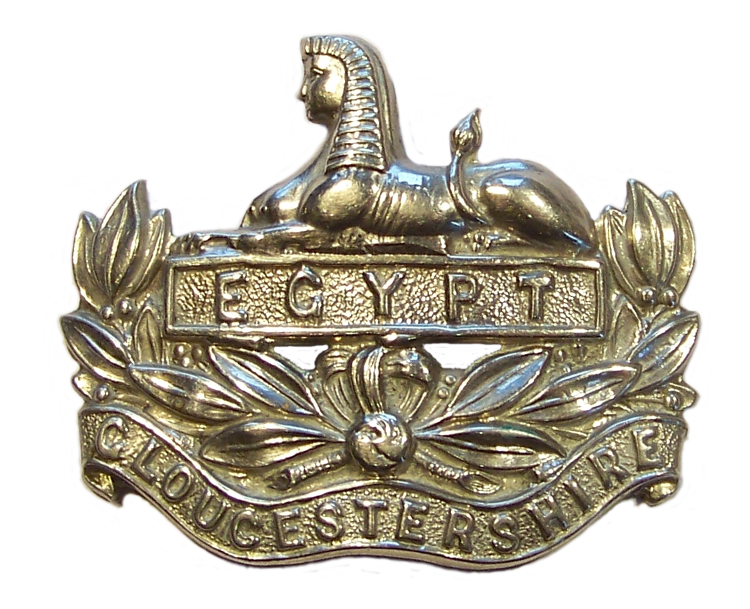
- Cap badge of the Gloucestershire Regiment
- Active: 24 July 1900 – 1 November 1938
- Country: United Kingdom
- Branch: Volunteer Force/Territorial Army
- Role: Infantry
- Size: 1–3 Battalions
- Part of: 48th (South Midland) Division; 61st (2nd South Midland) Division
- Garrison/HQ: St Michael's Hill, Bristol
- Engagements: Battle of the Somme; Attack at Fromelles; Third Battle of Ypres; Battle of Cambrai; Battle of the Asiago; Battle of Vittorio Veneto

Commanders
- Notable commanders: Lt-Col Sir Charles Hobhouse, 4th Baronet, MP, TD

Insignia
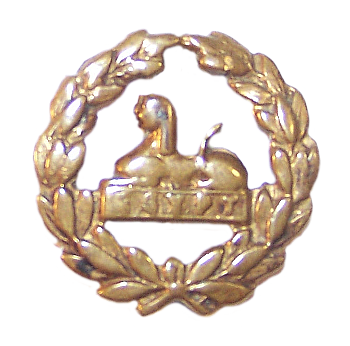
- The Glosters' Back badge

The 6th Battalion, Gloucestershire Regiment, was a Territorial Force unit of the British Army. Originally recruited in Gloucestershire as a Volunteer battalion of the Gloucestershire Regiment ('The Glosters') during the Second Boer War, it fought on the Western Front and in Italy during World War I. In the late 1930s it was converted into an armoured regiment and served as such during and after World War II

== Volunteer Force ==
The Volunteer Force, originally organised with great enthusiasm in 1859, had declined in numbers in the later 19th Century, but received a boost when Volunteers were allowed to serve alongside Regular Army units during the Second Boer War. A number of new units were formed at the time, including the 3rd Volunteer Battalion, Gloucestershire Regiment, raised at Bristol from February 1900 and officially accepted on 24 July 1900. The new battalion consisted of eight companies based at St Michael's Hill, Bristol, and was commanded by Lieutenant-Colonel Greville McLellan, a retired Major in the 3rd Dragoon Guards. Among the officers was the Rt Hon Charles Hobhouse, MP for Bristol East, a former Militia Captain in the King's Royal Rifle Corps, who was appointed major in the new battalion and succeeded to its command three years later. It adopted the khaki uniform worn by the Imperial Yeomanry serving at that time in South Africa, and the Commander-in-Chief in South Africa, Lord Roberts became its Honorary Colonel.

== Territorial Force ==
When the Volunteers were subsumed into the new Territorial Force (TF) under the Haldane Reforms of 1908 the battalion became the 6th Battalion, Gloucestershire Regiment. It formed part of the Gloucester & Worcester Brigade in the TF's South Midland Division. The battalion also had two cadet companies attached to it

== World War I ==
=== Mobilisation ===
The units of the South Midland Division had just set out for annual training when war broke out in August 1914. The Gloucester & Worcester Brigade travelled to Minehead on 2 August, but in view of the international situation the 6th Gloucesters returned to Bristol next day and the men were dismissed to their homes to await orders for mobilisation, which were issued on 4 August. The South Midland Division began concentrating at Swindon in Wiltshire, shortly afterwards moving to Essex as part of Central Force. 6th Gloucesters was billeted in villages outside Chelmsford.

Shortly after the declaration of war, TF units were invited to volunteer for Overseas Service. On 15 August 1914, the War Office (WO) issued instructions to separate those men who had signed up for Home Service only, and form them into reserve units. On 31 August, the formation of a reserve or 2nd Line unit was authorised for each 1st Line unit where 60 per cent or more of the men had volunteered for Overseas Service. The titles of these 2nd Line units would be the same as the original, but distinguished by a '2/' prefix. In this way duplicate battalions, brigades and divisions were created from the recruits who were flooding in. Later they were mobilised for overseas service in their own right and a 3rd Line created.

=== 1/6th Gloucesters ===
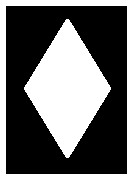
48th (South Midland) Divisional insignia. (Note: Michael Chappell comments that starting in 1918 the white diamond "was painted on helmets ... with regimental badges superimposed" upon it.)

The South Midland Division underwent progressive training in Essex, and on 13 March 1915 received orders to embark to join the British Expeditionary Force (BEF) in France. The Gloucester & Worcester Brigade crossed from Folkestone to Boulogne, and by 3 April the whole division had concentrated near Cassel. After training in Trench warfare the battalion went into the line near Ploegsteert ('Plugstreet') attached to experienced 17th Brigade for instruction. By the middle of the month the South Midland Division had become responsible for its own section of the front, with 1/6th Gloucesters at Plugstreet Wood. Here the commanding officer (CO), Lt-Col William Anderson, went sick and command temporarily devolved on the adjutant, Capt John Micklem, a Regular officer of the Rifle Brigade who had been on the Western Front since August 1914 (Micklem was later promoted to the command permanently). On 12 May 1915 the division was designated 48th (South Midland) Division and the brigade became 144th (Gloucester & Worcester) Brigade. It moved to take over the Hébuterne sector from the French Army on 20 July, and remained there until July 1916.

On the night of 25/26 November 1915 C Company carried out 1/6th Gloucesters' first trench raid, on German trenches and shelters in a corner of Gommecourt Wood. An artillery bombardment to cut the German barbed wire had been fired by 1/III South Midland Brigade, Royal Field Artillery, on the preceding afternoon, and the hope was to catch a German working party repairing the wire during the night. The five officers and 100 other ranks of the raiding party had practised the operation and an officer and 20 men crept out after dark to occupy 'Z Hedge' half-way across No man's land. It was now bright moonlight, and the officer in charge, Capt V.N. Young, telephoned the CO to say that the raiders would never get in: Lt-Col Micklen ordered them to carry on. The main body moved up to Z Hedge, then two raiding parties went out slowly under the moonlight and got within 70 yards (64 m) of the German trenches just before midnight. Captain Young waited until a cloud obscured the moon, then the artillery Forward Observation Officer called down a Box barrage, isolating the sector to be attacked. The raiders dashed forward as the shells fell: the right party got into the trench, causing damage and many casualties, and taking a prisoner; the left part ran into intact wire, which had to be cut before they could enter the trench. At the end of the raid both parties retired to join the support party at Z Hedge, which fired Rifle grenades into the vacated trenches while the raiders returned to the British line. The casualties from this successful raid were one man killed and one missing, two officers and 18 other ranks slightly wounded. (Note: One of the wounded officers (who both received the Military Cross (MC) for their part in the raid) was 2nd Lt Thomas Pryce. He returned to France with 2/6th Gloucesters after recovering from his wound, winning a Bar to his MC at Fromelles. He later transferred to the Grenadier Guards and was awarded a posthumous Victoria Cross for his actions in April 1918.) 1/6th Gloucesters were themselves raided on the night of 18/19 March 1916, but managed to defend their outposts for the loss of 12 men killed, 29 wounded or gassed, and three missing.

Map of the Glosters' actions at Ovillers.

==== Somme ====
The battalion served in the trenches for 16 months before it participated in its first major battle, during the Somme offensive. On the First day on the Somme (1 July) 1/6th Bn was in reserve and did not participate in the division's actions. An attack the following day was cancelled. On 19 July the division went into the line north-east of Ovillers-la-Boiselle and began 'softening' the German strongpoints in front of the Pozières Ridge by sending out bombing parties. The main attack (the Battle of Pozières) was launched at 00.30 on 23 July. 144th Brigade was bombarded in its forming-up trenches, and when the leading platoons went 'over the top' they walked straight into a storm of machine-gun fire. The Official History recorded that 'the 1/6th Gloucestershire was literally mown down, only a few bombers succeeding in entering the German line near the railway. These gallant men were soon overwhelmed'.

The division was back in action on Pozières Ridge on the night of 14–15 August, trying unsuccessfully to recapture and hold 'Skyline Trench'. 1/6th Gloucesters was reported 'fighting gamely for possession of the German trenches on the slope at the south-western end of Skyline Trench, but met with no success'. The battalion assisted a renewed attempt the next night, but gained no more lasting success.

The 1/6th Battalion went into the line for another spell on 21 August, and early in the morning the Germans made a counter-attack against their forward position. This was repulsed, but between 05.30 and 1200 the battalion made three separate attempts to occupy a particular enemy position, and each time was bombed out. At 05.00 next morning the Germans assembled under a bank in front of the battalion's position, shielded by morning mist, and got through the line. The platoon beyond the point of breakthrough was cut off and scattered. The remainder of their company was forced back to the original line. The 1/6th Battalion sent out bombing parties covered by machine guns erected on the parapet. While they were being mounted Private Kerr spotted a German machine gun team coming into action. He knelt on the parapet in full view of the enemy and shot three of the German machine gunners, preventing the gun being opened on his company. There was further fierce fighting that night.

The battalion spent the winter on the Ancre Heights, and then participated in following the German retreat to the Hindenburg Line (Operation Alberich) in the spring of 1917. On 1 April 144th Brigade attacked Épehy, 1/6th Gloucesters advancing at 05.00 with A, C and D Companies in the firing line. Although met by brisk rifle fire from the outskirts, the battalion pushed through the village, meeting no serious resistance until it reached the objective, a railway embankment beyond, at about 06.30. At that time the artillery put a barrage down on the embankment and as soon as it ceased A and C Companies pushed on to consolidate the position.

Although the pursuit was over by 5 April along most of the line, fighting continued on 48th (SM) Division's front as it advanced its outposts towards the main Hindenburg position. 1/6th Gloucesters established battalion HQ in a cellar at Villers-Faucon, but early in the morning of 18 April this was destroyed by explosives left on a delayed-action fuse by the retreating Germans. The CO, Lt-Col Thomas Nott, and his brother Capt Louis Nott the adjutant were killed together with the battalion Medical Officer and three other officers. Captain John Crosskey, from the 1/5th Warwickshire Regiment, assumed temporary command of the battalion for its next operation, on 23 April. The objective was The Knoll, with A and B Companies in the first line, C in support and D in reserve in the original line. At Zero hour, 03.45, the companies advanced, and had got about 200 yards (180 m) before running into a machine gun barrage. The first line reached its objective, but the second line got broken up and the two forward companies were outnumbered and were thrown out of the enemy line. C Company made another attempt to get forward with fighting patrols but these were subjected to heavy small arms fire as soon as they showed themselves on the skyline and were forced to return to the starting line. In this failed attack the battalion lost two officers and four other ranks killed or died of wounds, five officers and 72 men wounded and 12 missing.

==== Ypres ====
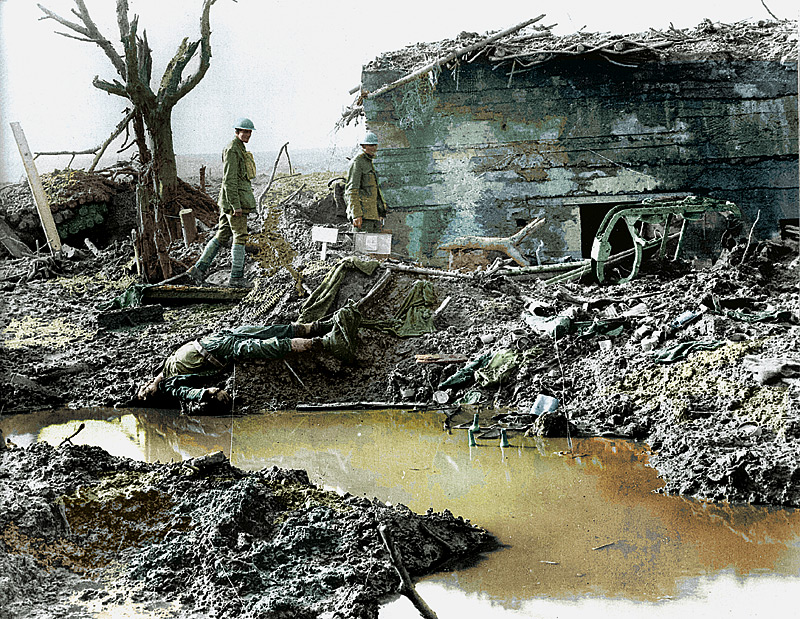
Captured German pillbox or 'Mebu' at Ypres

May and June were quiet months along 48th (SM) Division's front, then in July the battalions went for training before moving to the Ypres Salient to take part in the Third Ypres Offensive. During the Battle of Langemarck (16–18 August), 144th Brigade and 1/6th Gloucesters were in reserve and were not engaged. However, on 22 August, two companies of the battalion participated in a minor operation, the objective being to clear a crossroads. D Company attacked on the right, B Company on the left, following a barrage, each with the intention of occupying a farm ('Springfield' and 'Vancouver' respectively) and making contact with the neighbouring unit on either flank. Little is known about this confused action, where Vancouver was temporarily occupied with the help of two tanks, but at the end of the day the battalion was only half-way between its starting position and the objectives. It was relieved that night, and then supported a further attack on 27 August that finally took Springfield and Vancouver.

As the offensive continued, 48th (SM) Division took part in the costly battles of Polygon Wood (28 September–3 October) and Broodseinde (4 October), but 1/6th Gloucesters was not engaged until the Battle of Poelcappelle on 9 October. A and B Companies advanced in the first line towards the objectives of Vacher Farm, Burns House and the Cemetery, and a number of old gun-pits that had been fortified by the enemy; C and D Companies would then pass through to the second objective. Unlike some units that were held up by mud and congestion, the battalion was in position on its starting tapes three hours before Zero hour. The first wave got away promptly behind the barrage, moving slowly through the mud and heavy enemy fire. A Company ran into considerable opposition but two platoons that had lost their officers forced their way into a trench, taking prisoners and capturing four machine guns. The rest of the company passed through the unrecognisable ruins of Vacher Farm. B Company cleared the Cemetery of snipers and a machine gun team, then charged the shell-holes in front of the pillbox known as '2 Mebu'. By now the second wave was close behind and immediately passed through to keep up with the barrage. C and D Companies got 200 yards (180 m) beyond the Burns House–Vacher Farm road and captured 2 Mebu with its machine guns. Rifle and Lewis gun fire, and a renewed artillery barrage, drove off three German counter-attacks. The battalion had captured 70 prisoners and 12 machine guns, but had suffered 242 casualties, of whom 87 died. The division was pulled out of the line and went into camp on 11 October before moving to a quiet sector near Vimy.

==== Italy ====
On 10 November 1917 the 48th (SM) Division received orders to move to Italy. It entrained by half battalions on 23–23 November and by 1 December the units had finished detraining around Legnago on the Adige. 1/6th Gloucesters was at Villaraspa, then at year's end it was at Sandrigo. On 1 March 1918 the division relieved 7th Division in the front line of the Montello sector on the Piave Front, and held the line until 16 March. On 1 April it moved westward into the middle sector of the Asiago Plateau Front.

Early in the morning of 15 June the Austro-Hungarian Army made what proved to be its last attack, known to the British participants as the Battle of Asiago. The 48th (SM) Division had been particularly hard-hit by the influenza epidemic, and the attacking Austrians got through the weakly-held defences to reach 1/5th Gloucesters' HQ. 1/6th Gloucesters had been waiting at Mount Serona to go into the line; the men were issued with extra ammunition and marched up to discover the situation in front. They arrived about 13.00, and joined a brigade counter-attack about 17.30. D Company only got about 150 yards (140 m) forward through the pine forest before being held up by machine gun fire. B Company lost touch with D, advanced against little opposition but failed to contact the unit on its other flank. After trying to turn the enemy flank they were attacked and obliged to withdraw to the line held by D Company. A and C Companies supported another inconclusive brigade counter-attack in the evening. However, next morning the brigade advanced in line at 08.30 and found the Austrian withdrawing; patrols from 1/6th Gloucesters recaptured the whole of the original front line positions. The battalion's losses were one officer and 14 other ranks killed, three officers and 39 other ranks wounded and one missing, but it captured one officer and 168 men unwounded, 30 wounded, 14 machine guns and a flamethrower.

For the rest of the summer the battalion was engaged in offensive patrolling against the increasingly demoralised Austrians. The Allies broke through the Austrians on the Piave at the Battle of Vittorio Veneto on 28 October, and shortly afterwards the Austrians began to abandon their positions on the Asiago plateau. On 31 October 1/6th Gloucesters established a picket line in what had been the Austrian front line, and the battalion was ordered to put in an attack at 05.45 next morning against the Austrians holding the entrance to the Valle d'Assa. Determined resistance was encountered, and the battalion was driven back, but a second attack next day ended with 1/6th Gloucesters atop Monte Catz, and the Valle d'Assa position was forced. After dark 48th (SM) Division pushed up the valley and entered Austrian territory. Although the advance was continued on 3 November, 1/6th Gloucesters were left behind, and were in billets at Cire when the Armistice of Villa Giusti was signed, ending the war on the Italian Front.

==== Postwar ====
1/6th Gloucesters recrossed the frontier back into Italy on 11 November and went into camp at Taranto in southern Italy. Demobilisation of 48th (SM) Division began in early 1919, but 1/6th Gloucesters was detached for further service. Leaving one company behind, it entrained for Brindisi on 23 February 1919, then sailed to Scutari in Albania. It carried out garrison duty in that country and Montenegro until May, when it was transported to Egypt and continued garrison duties. The company at Taranto never rejoined and was demobilised in September, but the rest of the battalion continued to grow as men with remaining service were transferred in from disbanded units. Finally it was demobilised in December 1919 and the remaining cadre with the Colours returned to Bristol on 25 March 1920.

The battalion's dead during the war amounted to 40 officers and 784 other ranks. (Note: Other estimates are lower, but the Commonwealth War Graves Commission did not always distinguish between the 1st and 2nd Line battalions.)

=== 2/6th Gloucesters ===
61st (2nd South Midland) Divisional insignia.

The 2nd Line battalion was formed in September 1914 at Bristol, with Lt-Col Thomas Carter in command from 7 October 1914. It took its place in 2/1st Gloucester and Worcester Brigade of 2nd South Midland Division. At first the men lived at home, and little or nothing was available in terms of uniforms, arms or equipment. It was not until the division concentrated at Northampton later in the month that they were issued with .256-in Japanese Ariska rifles with which to train. Here they formed part of First Army of Central Force, but when the 1st South Midland Division went to France, the 2nd took its place at Chelmsford and became part of Third Army of Central Force, with a definite role in Home Defence. The battalions formed their machine gun sections while at Chelmsford, but the strength of the battalions fluctuated widely as they were drawn upon for drafts for their 1st Line battalions. In August 1915 the division was numbered as the 61st (2nd South Midland) Division and the brigade became the 183rd (2/1st Gloucester and Worcester) Brigade.

In February and March 1916 the units of 61st (2nd SM) Division moved to Salisbury Plain to begin final training for overseas service. Here they were issued with .303 SMLE rifles in place of the Japanese weapons, and four Lewis guns per battalion in place of dummy guns and antique Maxim guns. Final leave was granted in April and May and entrainment for the embarkation ports began on 21 May. By 28 May the division was concentrating in France.

==== Fromelles ====
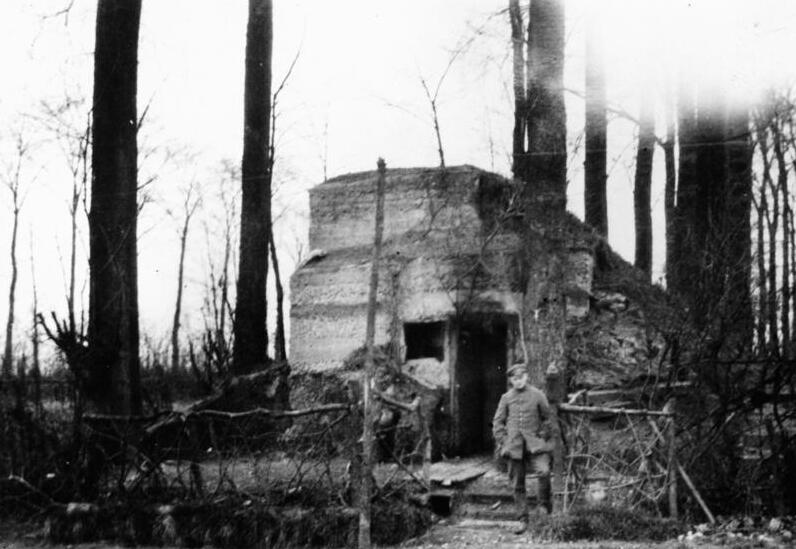
A German concrete strongpoint in the Fromelles salient, July 1916.

Unlike the 48th (SM) Division, which had over a year of trench service before undertaking its first attack, the 61st had only a matter of weeks. After a short tour of duty for each battalion in the front line near Laventie they were thrown into the Attack at Fromelles on 19 July 1916. In a diversionary attack to relieve pressure on the Somme front, the attacking troops were committed to a short advance over flat, waterlogged country against strong defences including concrete machine gun emplacements. The attack was timed for 17.30 on 19 July, after several days' bombardment of the enemy barbed wire and breastworks. 2/6th Gloucesters was among the attacking battalions, and suffered 50 casualties from German shellfire while they waited all day in their jumping-off positions. When the signal was given to advance the men were hit by Shrapnel shells as they tried to exit the Sally ports, and these had to be abandoned and the men went 'over the top' of the parapet. Once in No man's land the machine gun fire was so intense that they made no progress. The attack was a disaster, the assaulting battalions taking very heavy casualties, and was called off by 19.00. 61st (2nd SM) Division was only used for trench-holding for the rest of the year.

==== Ypres and Cambrai ====
In March and April 1917, the battalion saw action in the advance following the German retreat to the Hindenburg Line. 61st (2nd SM) Division moved to Ypres in July, and was put in as a fresh formation at the end of the Battle of Langemarck (see above) on 22 August. It made little progress then, or on 27 August or 10 September, suffering many casualties.

After the Ypres offensive ended, 61st (2nd SM) Division moved south to relieve British formations exhausted by German counter-attacks after the Battle of Cambrai. Early on 2 December the Germans began attacking one of 2/6th Gloucesters' positions, twice taking it and then losing it to a counter-attack before finally securing it at 06.30 when the Gloucesters' supply of bombs ran out. Then after a heavy barrage the Germans attacked the battalion on a wide front at 14.00, forcing it back 300 yards (270 m), despite counter-attacks. The acting CO, Maj William Ruthven of the East Yorkshire Regiment, who had only taken over on 21 November, was captured and died of his wounds. At dawn on 3 December the enemy continued the attack under an intense barrage; the battalion held on, but the nearby village of La Vacquerie was taken and the brigade was pushed back to the slopes of Welsh Ridge. The battalion had lost five officers and 168 other ranks killed or missing, and 12 officers and 140 other ranks wounded.

==== Disbandment ====
After the terrible casualties of 1917, the BEF was suffering a manpower crisis, and had to begin disbanding units to keep the others up to strength. 183rd Brigade was broken up, and 2/6th Gloucesters was disbanded on 20 February 1918. The men were drafted to the 2/5th Gloucesters in 61st (SM) Division, with the surplus going to 24th Entrenching Battalion, which carried out labour duties until the men were required as reinforcement drafts.

There are various estimates of the battalion's dead during its service, ranging from 296 to at least 329.

=== 3/6th Gloucesters ===
The 3rd Line battalions of the Gloucesters formed at their depots during 1915: Lt-Col Woodcock (the 6th Gloucesters' prewar CO) who had been left in the UK when 1/5th Bn went overseas, was appointed to command the new battalion on 10 April. The 3rd Line battalions then moved to Weston-super-Mare. On 8 April 1916 they were redesignated Reserve Battalions, and on 1 September at Ludgershall the 4th (City of Bristol) Reserve Bn absorbed the former 3/6th Bn.

== Interwar ==
The TF was reconstituted on 7 February 1920 (reorganising as the Territorial Army (TA) in 1921) and 6th Gloucesters reformed at the St Michael's Hill drill hall. It formed part of 144th (Gloucestershire & Worcestershire) Brigade once more. As well as its two cadet companies, the Fairfield School (Bristol) Cadet Corps was also affiliated to the battalion.

In the later 1930s the growing need for armoured units led to a number of TA infantry battalions being converted to that role. On 1 November 1938 the battalion became 44th Battalion (6th Battalion Gloucestershire Regiment), Royal Tank Regiment, soon afterwards redesignated as 44th Royal Tank Regiment (44th RTR). After the Munich Crisis the TA was rapidly doubled in size, and 44th RTR formed 50th Royal Tank Regiment (50th RTR) as a duplicate unit in April 1939.

== World War II ==
=== 44th Royal Tank Regiment ===
On the outbreak of war the regiment formed part of 21st Army Tank Brigade, a First Line TA formation in the UK. On 10 December 1940 it transferred to 1st Army Tank Brigade and served with it in the North African campaign, including the Second Battle of El Alamein. After the Fall of Tunis it came under Middle East Forces and was assigned to 4th Armoured Brigade for the campaigns in Sicily and Italy. It then returned to the UK for the invasion of Normandy and the campaign in North West Europe. In March 1945 the regiment was trained by 79th Armoured Division to operate Sherman DD amphibious tanks, and was the first DD tank unit to cross the Rhine on 24 March. On completion of the operation it reverted to a normal armoured role until VE Day.

=== 50th Royal Tank Regiment ===
The regiment mobilised in 23rd Army Tank (later Armoured) Brigade, a Second Line TA formation. It served with this formation in the North African campaign, including Alamein. For a few months from August 1943 it operated alongside 44th RTR in 4th Armoured Brigade in Italy before rejoining 23rd Armd Bde. In mid-1944 the brigade returned to Egypt for rest and refit. It was then sent to Greece in October to serve as infantry for security duties following the German evacuation. It saw action against the Greek People's Liberation Army (ELAS) during the Greek Civil War (the Dekemvriana), where 50th RTR was re-equipped with tanks in January 1945. It remained in Greece until the end of the war.

== Postwar ==
When the TA was reconstituted on 1 January 1947 44th and 50th RTR reformed at Bristol as an amalgamated 44th/50th RTR, and unlike some converted units did not rejoin the Glosters. On the reduction of the TA in 1956, the regiment amalgamated with the North Somerset Yeomanry on 31 October.

== Commanders ==
=== Honorary Colonels ===
The following served as Honorary Colonel of the battalion:

- Field Marshal Frederick Roberts, 1st Earl Roberts, appointed 5 September 1900, died 14 November 1914.
- Lt-Col Sir Charles Hobhouse, 4th Baronet, TD, former CO, appointed 24 December 1914, continued with 44th RTR, died 26 June 1941.

=== Commanding officers ===
Commanding officers included:

- Lt-Col Greville McLellan commissioned 18 July 1900
- Lt-Col Rt Hon Charles Hobhouse, MP for Bristol East, commissioned 5 April 1903, to 5 April 1911
- Lt-Col Herbert Woodcock, commissioned 5 April 1911

1/6th Battalion

- Lt-Col Herbert Woodcock to 7 March 1915
- Lt-Col William Anderson from 7 March to 10 July 1915
- Lt-Col John Micklem from 10 July 1915 to 7 January 1917
- Lt-Col Thomas Nott from 7 January 1917, killed in action 18 April 1917
- Capt John Crosskey (1/5th Warwicks) acting from 18 April 1917
- Lt-Col Harold Schomberg from 27 April 1917, wounded 10 February 1918
- Lt-Col Sidney Smith from 11 February 1918 to demobilisation

2/6th Battalion

- Lt-Col Thomas Carter from 7 October 1914 to 6 June 1916
- Lt-Col Francis Hamilton from 14 June, wounded 19 July 1916
- Maj Arthur Bartleet, acting from 19 July to 4 August 1916
- Lt-Col Frederick Leah from 4 August 1916 to 1 January 1917
- Maj Arthur Bartleet, acting from 1 January to 12 March 1917
- Lt-Col Ernest Slade from 11 March, invalided 21 November 1917
- Maj William Ruthven (East Yorkshires) acting from 21 November, died of wounds 2 December 1917
- Lt-Col Frederick Foster from 6 December 1917 to disbandment, 20 February 1918

3/6th Battalion

- Lt-Col Herbert Woodcock (from 1/6th Bn) from 10 April to 2 November 1915
- Lt-Col Lewis Protheroe from 2 November to disbandment 31 August 1916

6th Battalion

- Lt-Col F.W. Hek, commissioned 31 March 1921
- Brevet Colonel E.N. Gardner, OBE, MC, TD, commissioned 1 May 1934, continued as CO of 44th RTR

== Uniforms and insignia ==
The 3rd Volunteer Battalion adopted a Khaki uniform with scarlet facings, brown leggings, and a khaki Slouch hat with a green feather, similar to that worn by the Imperial Yeomanry serving in the Boer War. When it became the 6th Battalion in 1908 it adopted the standard uniforms of the Gloucesters: scarlet with white facings and dark blue Home Service helmet in full dress, or khaki service dress. The Glosters' facings changed to Primrose yellow in 1929. In 1918 the contribution of the TF battalions during World War I was recognised when they were permitted to adopt the famous 'Back Badge' of the Glosters.

== Battle Honours ==
The 6th Gloucesters were awarded the following Battle Honours:

1/6th Battalion

- France and Flanders 1915–17
- Ypres 1917
- Langemarck 1917
- Somme 1916
- Albert 1916
- Pozières
- Broodseinde
- Poelcapelle
- Italy 1917–18
- Piave
- Vittorio-Veneto

2/6th Battalion

- France and Flanders 1916–18
- Ypres 1917
- Langemarck 1917
- Cambrai 1917

== External sources ==
- Mark Conrad, The British Army, 1914 (archive site)
- Infantry Battalion COs of World War I.
- The Long, Long Trail
- Land Forces of Britain, the Empire and Commonwealth – Regiments.org (archive site)
- Graham Watson, The Territorial Army 1947
