= 144th Infantry Brigade (United Kingdom) =

Gloucester and Worcester Brigade 144th (Gloucester and Worcester) Brigade 144th Infantry Brigade 144th Infantry (Reserve) Brigade
- Active: 1908-1919; 1920-1946
- Country: United Kingdom
- Branch: Territorial Army
- Type: Infantry
- Size: Brigade
- Part of: 48th (South Midland) Division

The 144th Infantry Brigade was an infantry brigade of the British Army that saw active service in the First World War and again in the early stages of the Second World War before being reduced to a reserve brigade and remained in the United Kingdom for the rest of the war. In both world wars the brigade served with 48th (South Midland) Division.

== Formation ==
The Gloucester and Worcester Brigade was first raised under the Haldane Reforms in 1908 as part of the Territorial Force, which was formed by amalgamating the Volunteer Force and the Yeomanry, consisting of the 4th (City of Bristol) and 6th Volunteer battalions of the Gloucestershire Regiment and the 7th and 8th battalions of the Worcestershire Regiment. The brigade was assigned to the South Midland Division.

== First World War ==
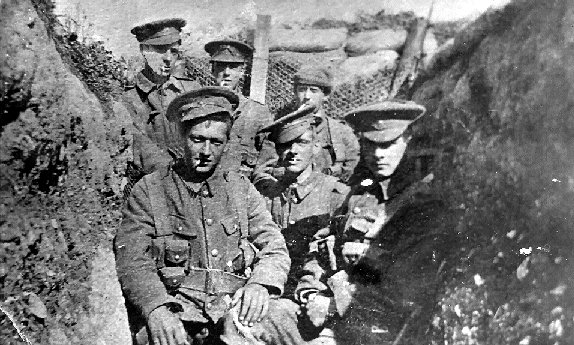
Men of the 1/8th Worcesters in the trenches, 1916.

The South Midland Division was mobilised on 4 August 1914, a day after the outbreak of the First World War. Most of the men of the brigade, when asked, volunteered for overseas service. Those who did not were formed into 2nd Line duplicate battalions and brigade, forming the 2nd Gloucester and Worcester Brigade, part of the 2nd South Midland Division, later to become 183rd (2/1st Gloucester and Worcester) Brigade and 61st (2nd South Midland) Division. The 1st Line battalions were also assigned the '1/' prefix, becoming, for example, 1/7th Worcesters and the 2nd Line became 2/7th Worcesters.

On 15 May 1915 the brigade was numbered the 144th (Gloucester and Worcester) Brigade and the division became 48th (South Midland) Division. In March 1915 the division was warned to prepare for overseas service on the Western Front to reinforce the Regulars of the British Expeditionary Force. The brigade served with the 48th Division throughout the war in the trenches of the Western Front in the Somme offensive of July 1916, pursuing the German Army in the retreat to the Hindenburg Line in March 1917 and later in the Third Battle of Ypres. In late 1917 the brigade was transferred to the Italian Front from 1917, and ended the war in Italy.

=== Order of battle ===
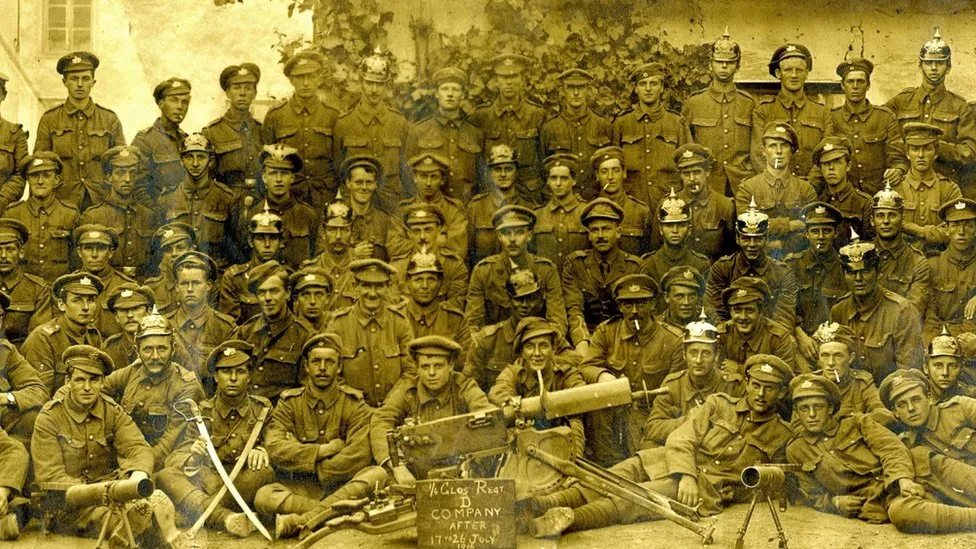
Soldiers of D Company, 1/4th Battalion, The Gloucestershire Regiment, with a captured German Maxim machine gun, and some wearing German helmets. A board in the foreground is dated "After 17–26 July 1916".

- 1/4th (City of Bristol) Battalion, Gloucestershire Regiment
- 1/6th Battalion, Gloucestershire Regiment
- 1/7th Battalion, Worcestershire Regiment
- 1/8th Battalion, Worcestershire Regiment (left September 1918)
- 144th Machine Gun Company, Machine Gun Corps (formed 23 January 1916, moved to 48th Battalion, Machine Gun Corps 22 March 1918)
- 144th Trench Mortar Battery (formed 14 June 1916)

== Between the wars ==
Disbanded in 1919 after the war, the brigade was reformed in the Territorial Army in the 1920s as the 144th (Gloucester and Worcester) Infantry Brigade and again assigned to the 48th Division, again consisting of the two battalions of the Glosters and two of the Worcesters.

The brigade saw little change during the inter-war years, apart from the 6th Battalion, Gloucestershire Regiment being transferred to the 145th (South Midland) Infantry Brigade and replaced by the 5th Glosters, from 145th Brigade. In 1938 all British infantry brigades from reduced from four to three battalions and so the 4th (City of Bristol) Battalion, Gloucestershire Regiment was converted into the 4th Battalion, The Gloucestershire Regiment (66th Searchlight Regiment), later transferring to the Royal Artillery. In 1939 the brigade was redesignated 144th Infantry Brigade.

== Second World War ==
The brigade and division were both mobilised on 1 September 1939, two days before the Second World War began, and when the war started, began training to eventually serve overseas.

The 144th Infantry Brigade, commanded by Acting Brigadier James Melvill Hamilton, was sent, with the rest of 48th Division, overseas to France in early January 1940 to join the rest of the British Expeditionary Force (BEF) which was stationed on the Franco-Belgian border. The 144th Brigade landed in France on 16 January 1940. Soon after arrival the 7th Battalion, Worcestershire Regiment was exchanged for the 2nd Battalion, Royal Warwickshire Regiment from the 5th Infantry Brigade of the 2nd Infantry Division, which was serving alongside 1st and 48th divisions in I Corps. This was due to BEF policy and the intention was to strengthen the Territorial divisions and give them vital experience.

In May 1940 the brigade fought the German Army in the battles of Belgium and France and, along with the rest of the BEF, were forced to retreat to Dunkirk and be evacuated to England after the Germans nearly surrounded the entire BEF from the French Army, which would undoubtedly have seen the destruction of the BEF, and the nucleus of the British Army. During the retreat a large number of men from the 2nd Royal Warwickshire Regiment, alongside men from the 4th Cheshire Regiment and the Royal Artillery, were involved in the Wormhoudt massacre which resulted in the deaths of 80 men killed by the German SS. After returning to the United Kingdom, the brigade, with the rest of 48th Division, spent the next few years on home defence, absorbing replacements after heavy casualties in France and training to repel a German invasion, which never arrived.

In late December 1942 the division was reduced to a Lower Establishment and eventually became a reserve training division with a draft finding role, in mid-1944, remaining in this capacity for the rest of the war. On 5 August 1944 the brigade was redesignated 144th Infantry (Reserve) Brigade, and became a training brigade for Scottish infantry regiments for the rest of the war, being disbanded in 1946 with the rest of the division and was not reformed in the Territorial Army reorganisation of 1947.

=== Order of battle ===
The 144th Infantry Brigade was constituted as follows during the war:

- 5th Battalion, Gloucestershire Regiment (until 21 May 1941, later became 43rd Reconnaissance Regiment, Reconnaissance Corps)
- 7th Battalion, Worcestershire Regiment (until 5 February 1940)
- 8th Battalion, Worcestershire Regiment (until 9 July 1944)
- 144th Infantry Brigade Anti-Tank Company (formed 2 November 1939, disbanded 11 February 1941)
- 2nd Battalion, Royal Warwickshire Regiment (from 5 February until 9 December 1940)
- 11th Battalion, South Staffordshire Regiment (from 9 December 1940 until 1 January 1943)
- 9th Battalion, Somerset Light Infantry (from 20 May 1941 until 13 September 1942)
- 31st Battalion, Royal Ulster Rifles (from 12 until 27 September 1942)
- 7th Battalion, Royal Ulster Rifles (from 27 September 1942 until 14 November 1943)
- 17th Battalion, Royal Fusiliers (from 10 December 1942 until 19 November 1943)
- 4th Battalion, Oxfordshire and Buckinghamshire Light Infantry (from 2 November 1943 until 9 July 1944)
- 5th Battalion, Royal Inniskilling Fusiliers (from 19 November 1943 until 9 July 1944)
- 10th Battalion, Cameronians (Scottish Rifles) (from 23 July 1944)
- 9th Battalion, Seaforth Highlanders (from 22 July 1944)
- 10th Battalion, Black Watch (Royal Highland Regiment) (from 22 July 1944)
- 2nd Battalion, London Scottish (from 10 September 1944)

=== Commanders ===
The following officers commanded 144th Infantry Brigade during the war:

- Brigadier J.M. Hamilton (until 10 October 1941)
- Lieutenant-Colonel J. Johnstone (Acting, from 10 to 14 October 1941)
- Brigadier W.L. Dibben (from 14 October 1941 until 17 April 1944)
- Lieutenant-Colonel H.W. Stitt (Acting, from 17 April until 8 May 1944)
- Brigadier R.G.W. Callaghan (from 8 May 1944 until 19 March 1945)
- Brigadier I.M. Stewart (from 19 March 1945)

== Bibliography ==
- Joslen, H. F. (2003) [1960]. Orders of Battle: Second World War, 1939–1945. Uckfield, East Sussex: Naval and Military Press. ISBN 978-1-84342-474-1.
- David Fraser (1999) [1983]. And We Shall Shock Them: The British Army in the Second World War. Cassell military. ISBN 978-0-304-35233-3.
