= Chantilly Conferences =

Series of conferences held by the Allied Powers of World War I

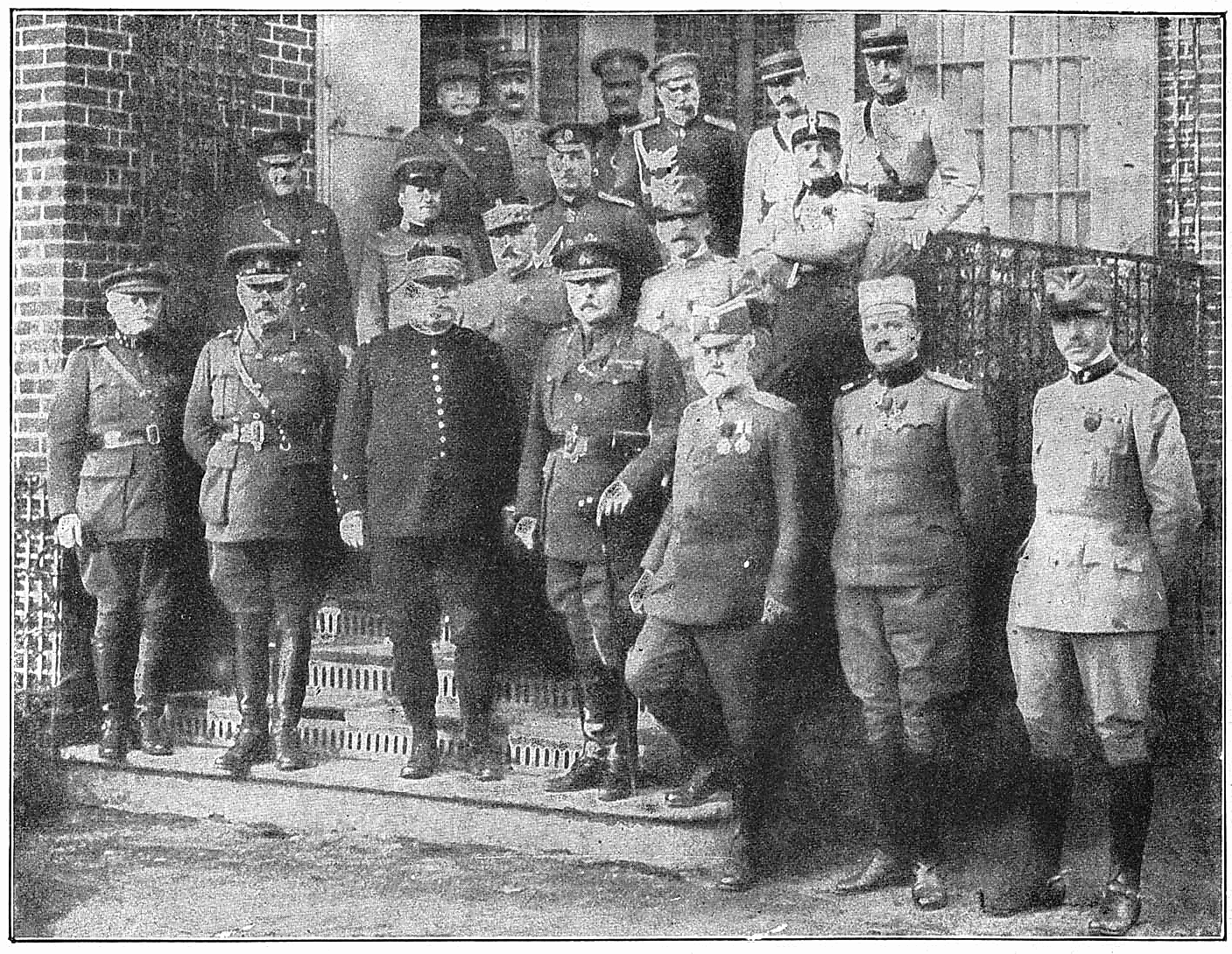
Participants of the Third Chantilly Conference

The Chantilly Conferences were a series of three conferences held between 1915 and 1916 by the Allied Powers of World War I. The conferences were named after Chantilly, France, where the meetings took place.

== First Chantilly Conference ==
Held from July 7, 1915, the first inter-allied military conference of the First World War was convened at Grand Quartier Général (GQG) in Chantilly France, shortly after Italy entered the war against the Central Powers. Attending were representatives from Britain (including the BEF Commander-in-Chief Sir John French and the BEF Chief of Staff William Robertson), France was represented by Alexandre Millerand, the Minister of War and Joseph Joffre, the Commander-in-Chief. Belgium, Italy, Serbia and Russia also sent representatives. Joffre told the delegates that concerted, coordinated action would create the most favourable conditions for an Allied victory to present themselves. No specific undertakings were agreed upon as a consequence of the conference. A later conference at Chantilly about five months later, was more ambitious in its aims and led to a commitment by the Allies to begin an offensive should an Ally be endangered by the Central Powers.

== Second Chantilly Conference ==
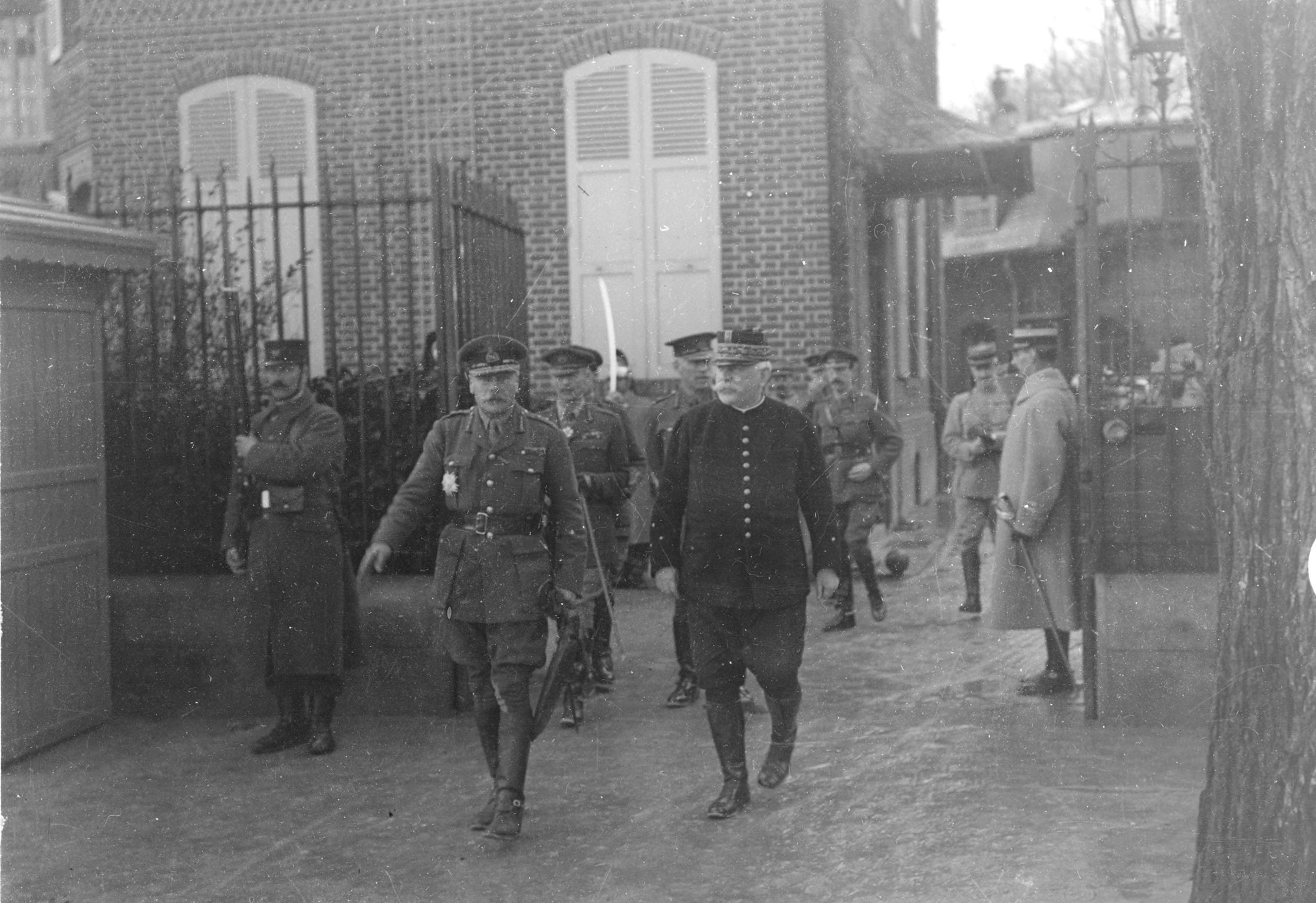
General Sir Douglas Haig and Field Marshal Joseph Joffre at the Chantilly Conference where the Allied strategy for 1916 was decided.

From 8 to 12 December 1915, an Allied military planning conference took place at GQG with the military representatives of the Allied powers, France, Britain, Russia, Serbia and Italy, to form a common strategy for 1916 against the Central Powers. The British representatives were the BEF Commander-in-Chief Sir John French and Chief of the Imperial General Staff Sir Archibald Murray (just before they were superseded by Douglas Haig and Robertson). General Carlo Porro (it) represented Italy. Joffre proposed and his Allied counterparts concurred that the offensives of the Allied armies on the Western Front should be delivered simultaneously or close enough so that the Central Powers would be unable to transport reserves from one front to another. The coordinated offensives were planned to commence as soon as possible, with local, limited attacks taking place in between, further to enervate the Central Powers, weather permitting.

From 12 to 13 March 1916 another meeting at Chantilly endorsed the plan for synchronised attacks, Russia to begin with an offensive at about 15 May and the rest joining in about two weeks later. Serbian troops had been re-equipped and were to be transferred to Salonika, the Italian army in Albania and the Franco-British Armée d'Orient in Macedonia would indefinitely maintain the threat of an attack. The delegates also agreed that the blockade on the Central Powers should be made more rigorous.

== Third Chantilly Conference ==
From 15 to 16 November 1916, the Allied generals met at Chantilly and the political leaders met in Paris before a combined session. In a memorandum, Joffre wrote that the combined offensive had shaken the Central Powers in 1916 and that a spring offensive should exploit this in France and against Bulgaria. Joffre suggested that the Russian army could be re-equipped, with arms and equipment sent from the west, to knock Bulgaria out of the war. Joffre wanted a bigger offensive on the Western Front than that of 1916 and for it to begin in February, to prevent the Central Powers from forestalling the Allies as they had in 1916 but the British claimed that they could not be ready until May and the Russian and Italian delegations followed suit. At the conclusion of the meeting, all agreed to a plan that would have decisive effect but that the February deadline was unachievable. Considerable time was devoted to discussion of the Balkans and the defeat of Bulgaria by attacks from the east and south and agreed that the force at Salonika be augmented, provided that troops were not diverted from France. The military leaders met with the politicians, with some disagreement about a force of 23 divisions for Salonika. Aristide Briand said that both meetings came to the same conclusions but David Lloyd George claimed that it was "little better than a farce". Before planning could begin in detail, Joffre was sacked and replaced by Robert Nivelle who substituted an altogether more ambitious plan for 1917.
