= Fritiof =

- Pronunciation: German: [ˈfʁɪtjɔf] Norwegian: [ˈfritjɔf] Swedish: [ˈfrɪtjɔf,ˈfrɪtɕɔf]
- Language: German, Norwegian, Swedish

Origin
- Language: Old Norse

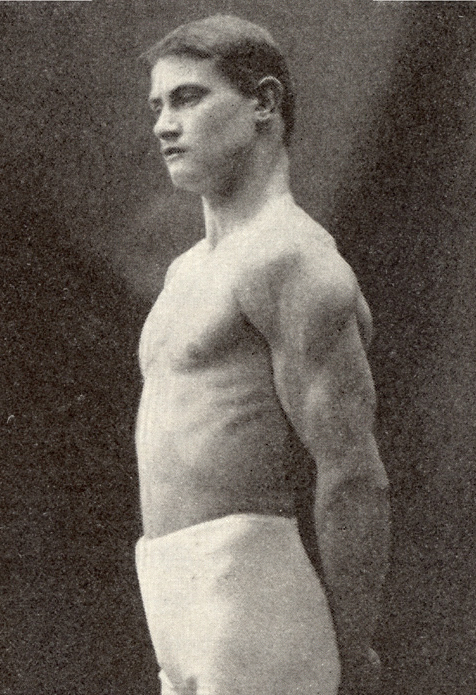
Frithiof Mårtensson

Friðþjófur (variations: Fritiof, Frithiof, Fritjof, Frithjof, and Fridtjof) is a Scandinavian masculine given name derived from Old Norse: friðr + þjófr, transl. 'peace' and 'thief'. Bearers of the name include:

== Iceland ==
- The hero of Frithiof's Saga, an Icelandic saga finalized around 1300

== Norway ==
- Frithjof M. Plahte (1836–1899), Norwegian merchant and landowner
- Frithjof Prydz (1841–1935), Norwegian judge
- Carl Frithjof Smith (1859–1917), Norwegian-German painter
- Fridtjof Nansen (1861–1930), Norwegian explorer
  - Fridtjof Nansen (disambiguation), things named in his honor
- Fritjof Heyerdahl (1879–1970), Norwegian engineer and industrial leader
- Frithjof Olsen (1882–1922), Norwegian gymnast
- Fridtjof Backer-Grøndahl (1885–1959), Norwegian pianist and composer
- Frithjof Olstad (1890–1956), Norwegian rower
- Frithjof Sælen (gymnast) (1892–1975), Norwegian gymnast
- Frithjof Andersen (1893–1975), Norwegian wrestler
- Fridtjof Knutsen (1894–1961), Norwegian journalist and crime novelist
- Fridtjof Paulsen (1895–1988), Norwegian speed skater
- Frithjof Lorentzen (1896–1965), Norwegian fencer
- Fridtjof Mjøen (1897–1967), Norwegian actor
- Carl Fridtjof Rode (1897–1984), Norwegian judge
- Frithjof Ulleberg (1911–1993), Norwegian footballer
- Frithjof Jacobsen (1914–1999), Norwegian diplomat
- Frithjof Tidemand-Johannessen (1916–1958), Norwegian designer and writer
- Frithjof Clausen (1916–1998), Norwegian wrestler
- Frithjof Sælen (writer) (1917–2004), Norwegian writer
- Fridtjof Frank Gundersen (born 1934), Norwegian jurist
- Leif Fritjof Måsvær (born 1941), Norwegian politician
- Frithjof Prydz (athlete) (1943–1992), Norwegian ski jumper and tennis player
- Fridtjof Røinås (born 1994), Norwegian racing cyclist
- Fridtjof Støre, singer for Norwegian band Albino Superstars (formed in 2004)

== Sweden ==
- Frithiof Holmgren (1831–1897), Swedish physician and physiologist
- Frithiof Mårtensson (1884–1956), Swedish wrestler
- Fritiof Domö (1889–1961), Swedish landlord and politician
- Fritiof Karlsson (1892–1984), Swedish politician
- Fritiof Nilsson Piraten (1895–1972), Swedish author
- Fritiof Svensson (1896–1961), Swedish wrestler
- Elof Fritjof Hillén (1893–1977), Swedish soccer player
- Frithiof Rudén, Swedish footballer
- Fritiof Billquist (1901–1972), Swedish film actor
- Tage Fritjof Erlander (1901-1985), Prime Minister of Sweden from 1946 to 1969
- Fritjof Lager (1905–1973), Swedish politician
- Fritiof S. Sjöstrand (1912–2011), Swedish physician and histologist
- Fritiof Enbom (1918–1974), Swedish railway worker
- Fritiof Andersson, title character of "Fritiof och Carmencita", a 1937 Swedish song written by Evert Taube
- Fritiof Björkén (born 1991), Swedish footballer

== Denmark ==
- Fritiof Andersen (1898–1954), Danish track and field athlete

== Finland ==
- Frithiof Nevanlinna (1894–1977), Finnish mathematician

== Germany ==
- SMS Frithjof (laid down 1890), German coastal defense ship
- Frithjof Henckel (born 1950), German rower
- Frithjof Schmidt (born 1953), German politician for the Greens
- Frithjof Kleen (born 1983), German sailor
- Frithjof Seidel (born 1997), German diver

== Switzerland ==
- Frithjof Schuon (1907–1998), Swiss metaphysician

== United States ==
Norwegian descent

- Karl Fritjof Rolvaag (1913–1990), American politician

Swedish descent

- Fritiof Fryxell (1900–1986), American geologist and mountain climber

Austrian descent

- Frithjof Bergmann (1930–2021), German-American philosopher
- Fritjof Capra (born 1939), American physicist, ecologist, and systems theorist

== Antarctica ==
- Fridtjof Island, lying in the Palmer Archipelago

== See also ==
- Friedhof (disambiguation)
