= List of cemeteries in Germany =

The following is an incomplete list of cemeteries in Germany.

== Baden-Württemberg ==
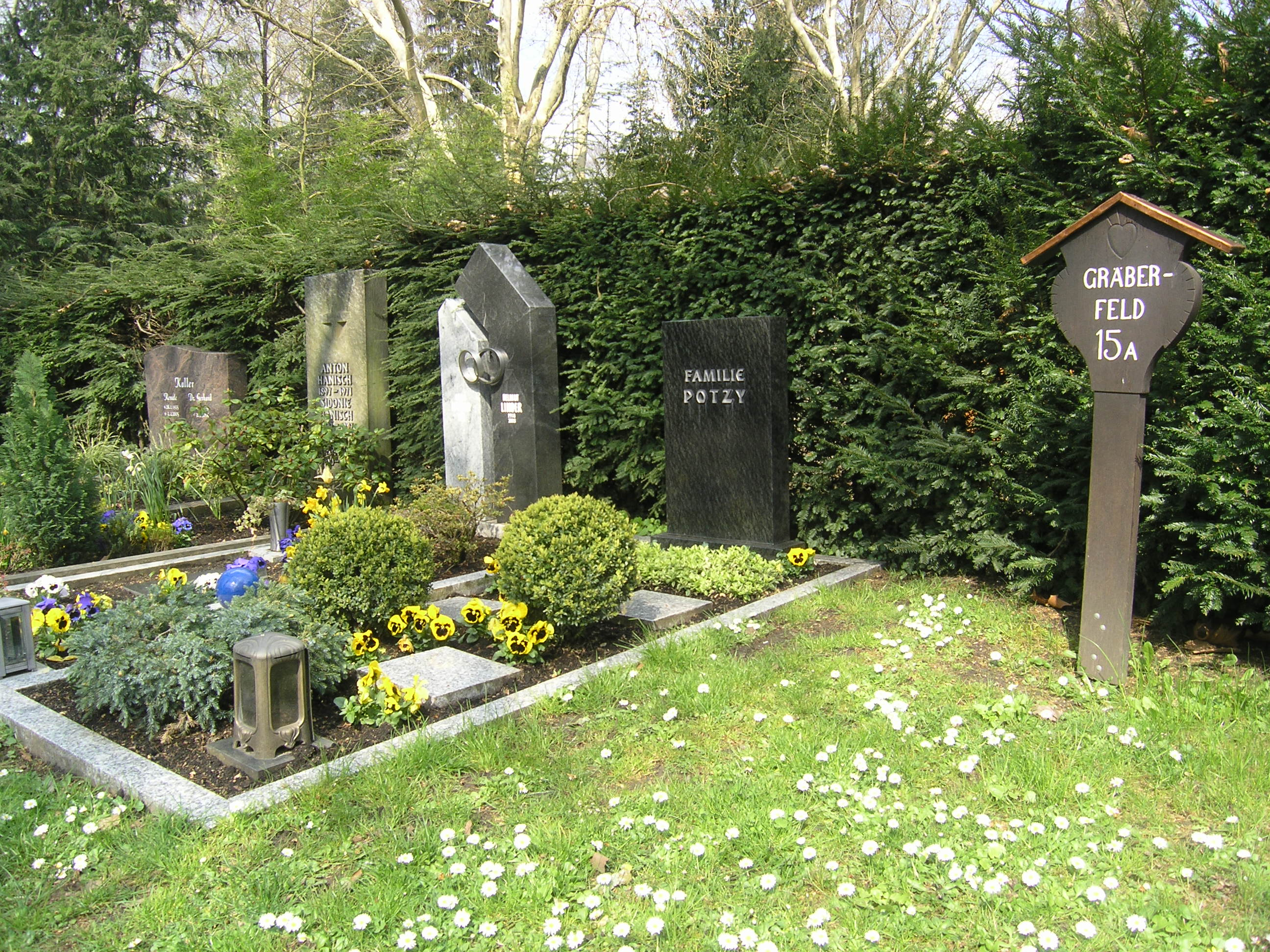
In Karlsruhe Hauptfriedhof. Ornamental plants and creative tombstones are typical for German cemeteries.

- Königsfeld im Schwarzwald, God's Acre, a Moravian cemetery
- Freiburg, Friedhof Günterstal: Burial site of Sepp Allgeier, Walter Eucken and Hans Filbinger
- Freiburg, Hauptfriedhof Freiburg im Breisgau, Burial and memorial to 1664 victims of the 1944 air raid
- Freiburg, Alter Friedhof, Consecrated in 1683, one of Germany's oldest cemeteries
- Heidelberg, Bergfriedhof
- Meersburg, Städtischer Friedhof, Burial site of Annette von Droste-Hülshoff, Franz Anton Mesmer and Fritz Mauthner
- Tübingen:
  - Stadtfriedhof, Burial site of Ludwig Uhland, Friedrich Silcher, Friedrich Hölderlin, Carlo Schmid and Kurt Georg Kiesinger
- Überlingen, Burial site of Wera Frydtberg und Fred Raymond

== Bavaria (Bayern) ==
- Andechs, Kloster Andechs und Wittelsbacher Friedhof. Burial site of the Wittelsbachs
- Ansbach, Stadtfriedhof, Burial site of Kaspar Hauser and Johann Peter Uz
- Ansbach, St. Gumbertus Abbey, Burial site of some princes of the Hohenzollern family and of Maximilian Emanuel of Württemberg-Winnental
- Aschaffenburg, Friedhof, Burial site of Clemens Brentano
- Aschau im Chiemgau, Burial site of Hans Clarin
- Augsburg, Augsburg Protestant Cemetery, Burial site of Karl Albert Gollwitzer and Anna Barbara von Stetten
- Bad Hindelang, Burial site of Gustl Gstettenbaur, Sepp Rist and Carla Rust
- Bad Wiessee, Burial site of Katharina de Bruyn, Hans Carste, Josef Ertl, Franz Grothe, Ludwig Marcuse and Berta Morena
- Bayreuth, Bayreuth Friedhof Burial site of Richard Wagner, Franz Liszt and Jean Paul amongst others
- Bechhofen (Central Franconia), Jewish Cemetery
- Dachau, Burial site of Isebil Sturm, August Peter Waldenmaier and Ignatius Taschner
- Feldafing, Burial site of Hans Baur and Heinrich Knote
- Feldkirchen, Burial site of Ruth Drexel
- Flintsbach, Burial site of Werner Stocker
- Freising, Burial site of Karl Obermayr and Roider Jackl
- Gmund am Tegernsee, Burial site of Helga Anders, Peter Boenisch, Willy Bogner, Sr., Ludwig Erhard and Siegfried Lindner
- Grassau, Burial site of Willy Reichert
- Grünwald, Burial site of Jan Alverdes, Wolfgang Becker, Lothar Brühne, Walter Carnuth, Erik Charell, Lil Dagover and Georg Witt, Erich Engels, Carl Ernst Englert, Hertha Feiler, Jürgen Feindt, Manfred Fürst, Jakob Geis, Kurt Großkurth, Jan Groth, Margarethe Haagen, Richard Häussler, Ullrich Haupt, Joachim Hess, Käthe Hestler-Itter, Carola Höhn, Herbert Jarczyk, Horst Jüssen, Joseph Keilberth, Franz Klarwein, Richard König, Oscar Lepka-Marion, Mario Lerch-Rossi, Werner Lieven, Theo Nischwitz, Jaroslaw Prohaska, Akos Rathonyi, Christian Schmitz-Steinberg, Heinz Schorlemmer, Eugen Schuhmacher, Josef Sieber, Henry R. Sokal, Luise Ullrich, Gerd Vespermann, Hans Fritz Wilhelm, Richard Wolf and Gertrud Wolle
- Heilsbronn, Heilsbronn Abbey, Burial site of some princes of the Hohenzollern family
- Icking, Burial site of Gert Fröbe, Wilhelm Rode, Ludwig Stiel and Luise Willer
- Ingolstadt, Burial site of Adolf Scherzer
- Irschenberg, Burial site of Ludwig Schmid-Wildy
- Krailling, Burial site of Gustl Bayrhammer, Hans Fitz and Walter Fitz, Hermann Prey, Günther Rennert and Leon Richter
- Miesbach, Waldfriedhof, Burial site of Toni Babl, Lothar Cremer and Max Heimbucher
- Neuendettelsau, Friedhof, Burial site of Wilhelm Löhe
- Nuremberg, Johannisfriedhof
- Oberaudorf, Burial site of Alix Degrelle-Hirth du Frenes and Walter Rilla
- Oberstdorf, Waldfriedhof, Burial site of Anderl Heckmair, Walter Kalot and Gertrud von Le Fort
- Ottobrunn, Burial site of Karin Hübner
- Planegg, Burial site of Werner Kleine, Maria von Tasnady and Géza von Radványi, Karl Valentin and Berta Böheim-Valentin
- Pullach,
  - Gemeindefriedhof Burial site of Michl Lang, Gertrude Kappel-Vukas and Edmund Kunath
  - Cemetery od the Jesuits, Burial Site of Alois Grillmeier, Augustin Rösch
- Rehau, Friedhof, Burial site of victims of Helmbrechts concentration camp
- Rosenheim, Burial site of Paul Hartmann, Willy Rösner, Johann Klepper, Alfred Heurich and Walter Gorn
- Rott am Inn, Burial site of Franz-Josef Strauß
- Rottach-Egern, Burial site of Hedwig Courths-Mahler, Bernt Engelmann, Ludwig Ganghofer, Alexander Golling, Leo Slezak and Walter Slezak and Margarethe Slezak-Winter, Alexander Spoerl, Heinrich Spoerl and Ludwig Thoma
- Schliersee, Burial site of Magda Lena Achmann, Werner Bochmann, Jenny Haibel and Willy Haibel, Georg Jennerwein, Bernd Scholz, Franz Seitz Jr. and Franz Seitz Sr., Hans Terofal and Xaver Terofal and Alois Wolf
- Straßberg, Burial site of Roy Black
- Straßlach, Burial site of Erik Schumann
- Tegernsee, Burial site of Michael Dengg, Ferdinand Feldigl, Ernst Lochmann, Winnie Markus and Adi Vogel, Oskar Messter and Hans Schabel-Dengg
- Traunreut, Burial site of Brigitte Koesters and Hans Heinz Koesters
- Tutzing, Burial site of Zdenka Faßbender, Elly Ney, Benno Sterzenbach, Heinrich Vogl and Therese Vogl
- Unterhaching, Burial site of Amadeus August, Paula Braend, Hans Drechsler, Manfred Ott and Fritz Straßner
- Weißenstadt, Burial site of Peter Beauvais
- Wolfratshausen, Burial site of Ina Gerheim and Gusta Hammer
- Wunsiedel, Friedhof, Burial site of Rudolf Heß
- Würzburg, Burial site of Kurt Mantel

== Berlin ==
- Berlin – Charlottenburg, Friedhof Heerstraße, Burial site of Leo Blech, Karl Bonhoeffer, Horst Buchholz, Tilla Durieux, George Grosz, Maximilian Harden, Hilde Hildebrand, Joachim Ringelnatz and Grethe Weiser.
- Berlin – Charlottenburg, Kaiser-Wilhelm-Gedächtnis-Friedhof, Burial site of John Rabe and Franz Betz
- Berlin – Charlottenburg, British War Cemetery, Heerstraße.
- Berlin – Lichtenberg, Zentralfriedhof Friedrichsfelde. Burial site of Rosa Luxemburg, Karl Liebknecht.
- Berlin – Mitte, Invalidenfriedhof. Burial site of Reinhard Heydrich, Fritz Todt, Gerhard von Scharnhorst, Manfred von Richthofen temporary, Hans von Seeckt, Werner von Fritsch, Karl von Bulow, Ernst Udet, Werner Moelders, Helmuth von Moltke, Alfred von Schlieffen
- Berlin – Nikolassee, Waldfriedhof Zehlendorf. Burial site of Willy Brandt and Tatjana Gsovsky.
- Berlin – Schöneberg, Städtischer Friedhof III. Burial site of Marlene Dietrich and Helmut Newton.
- Berlin – Weißensee, Weißensee Cemetery. One of the largest old Jewish cemeteries in Europe.
- Berlin – Zehlendorf (Berlin), St Annen Friedhof, Dahlem Dorf. Burial site of Rudi Dutschke.
- Berlin – Zehlendorf, Waldfriedhof Dahlem, Hüttenweg. Burial site of Gottfried Benn, Karl Hofer, Bernd Rosemeyer and Werner Sombart.

== Hamburg ==
- Hamburg, Hauptfriedhof Ohlsdorf (Ohlsdorf Main Cemetery), with 4.05 km^{2} largest park cemetery on Earth.

== Lower Saxony (Niedersachsen) ==
- Becklingen War Cemetery (CWGC)
- Norden
- Lüneburg, Tiergarten Cemetery, which holds the graves of 167 prisoners from Bergen-Belsen.

== North Rhine-Westphalia (Nordrhein-Westfalen) ==
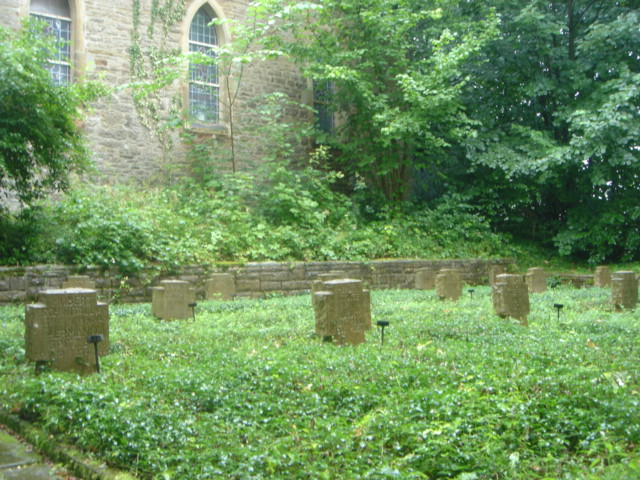
Cemetery for Russian soldiers, Balve

- Balve, for Russian soldiers

== Rhineland-Palatinate (Rheinland-Pfalz) ==
- Worms, Jewish Cemetery in Worms

== Saxony (Sachsen) ==
- Dresden, Alter Annenfriedhof, Neuer Annenfriedhof
- Dresden, Eliasfriedhof, the oldest remaining cemetery in the city
- Dresden – Loschwitz, Loschwitz Cemetery, the current cemetery, in two parts, opened in about 1800, when the older Loschwitz Church Cemetery became full
- Dresden – Tolkewitz, Johannisfriedhof, the main cemetery, associated with the Evangelical Church, has been joined by the municipal Urnenhain since 1911
- Dresden, Nordfriedhof, originally for military burials now operating as a public cemetery
- Herrnhut, God's Acre, the original Moravian graveyard on the hill "Hutberg"
- Leipzig, the Südfriedhof (Leipzig), one of the largest park-like cemeteries in Germany

== Schleswig-Holstein ==
- Lübeck, Burgtor-Friedhof
- Rendsburg, Garnisonsfriedhof
