= Philip Hepworth =

British architect

Philip Dalton Hepworth
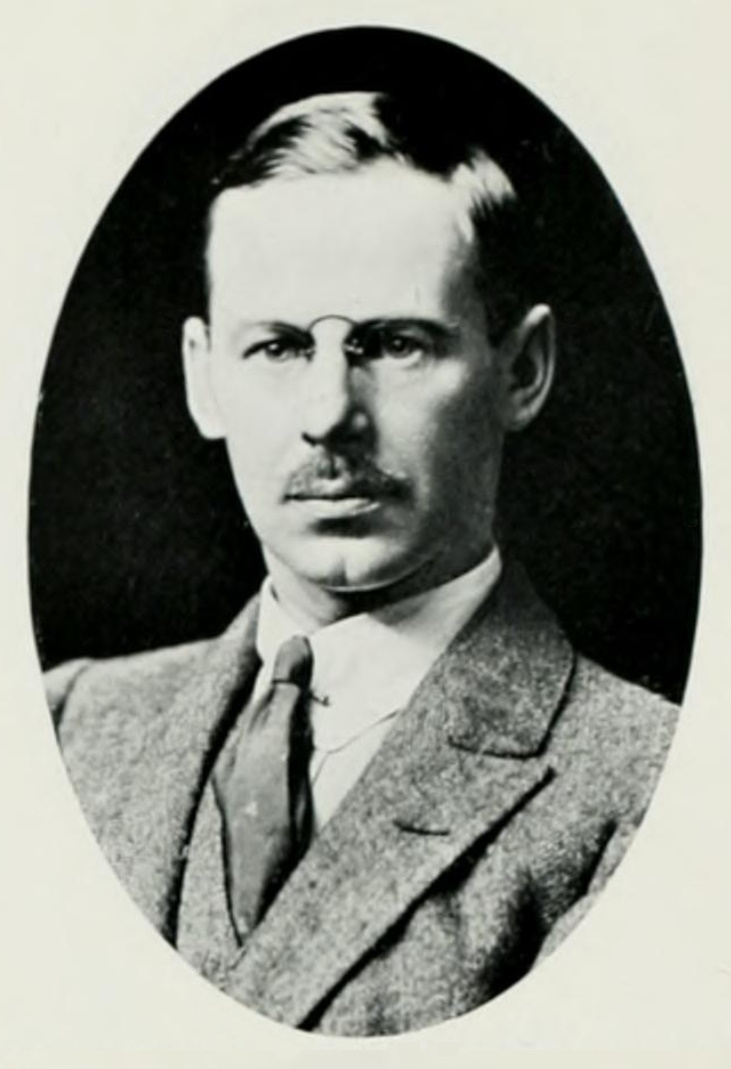
- Photographic portrait of Philip Hepworth
- Born: 12 March 1888; Hampstead, London, England
- Died: 21 February 1963 (aged 74); London, England
- Education: Architectural Association School of Architecture; École des Beaux-Arts
- Occupation: Architect
- Buildings: Walthamstow Town Hall

Philip Dalton Hepworth (12 March 1888 (Note: The RIBA Journal obituary by E. J. Miller states that Hepworth was born in Hampstead in 1888, and the 1912 Highgate School Register gives the precise date in that year. Other sources give 1890 as his birth year.) – 21 February 1963) was a British architect. He studied in both the UK and France, at the Architectural Association School of Architecture and the École des Beaux-Arts, and returned to work as an architect after serving in the First World War. He rose to prominence in the 1930s, featuring in a book by architectural critic Trystan Edwards and winning the commission in 1932 to design Walthamstow Town Hall, which was eventually completed in 1942. Another civic building of this period was Wiltshire County Hall at Trowbridge. He also designed a handful of private houses, including Pemberley, in Loughton, 1936. He lived in Zoffany House in Strand-on-the-Green, Chiswick, London, from 1936.

During the Second World War, he was appointed one of the Principal Architects of the Imperial War Graves Commission (now the Commonwealth War Graves Commission). In this post-war stage of his career, he designed several war memorials and numerous cemeteries for the British war dead. Examples of his Commission work are found in France, Belgium, the Netherlands and Germany. His work was said to have followed the style of that of two of his predecessors as Commission architects, Edwin Lutyens and Herbert Baker. Hepworth, who died in 1963, was described in his obituary as an architect of "great speed and brilliance" and "sensitivity and eccentricity", influenced by "classical, English and local Norman styles". A number of his buildings are listed.

== Studies and early career ==
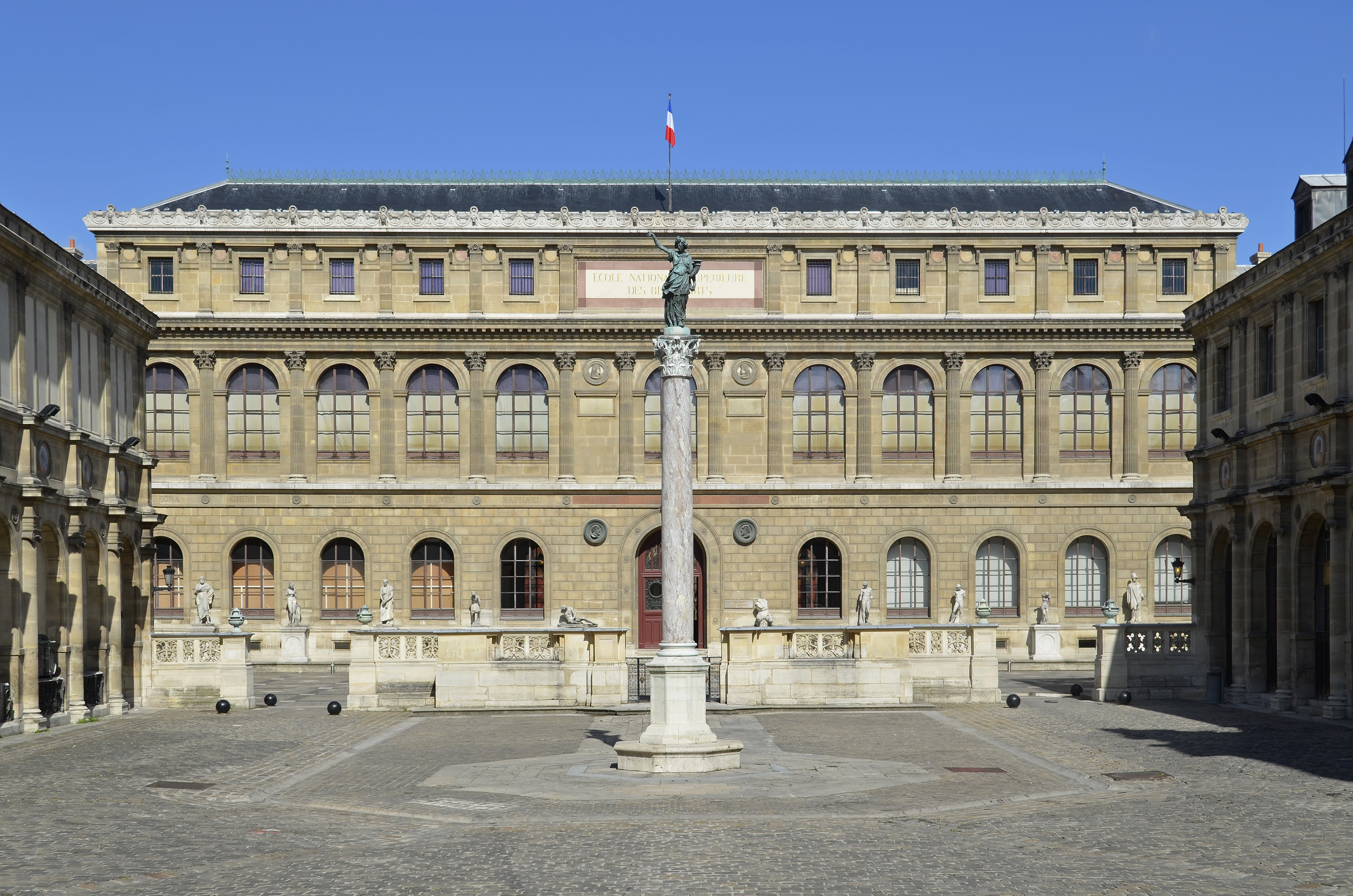
Hepworth studied at the École des Beaux-Arts

Hepworth was born in 1890. He attended Highgate School from September 1902 until July 1906. His initial architectural studies were at the Architectural Association School of Architecture from 1906 to 1910, during which time he also attended the École des Beaux-Arts in Paris, France. He became assistant to London-based architect Walter Frederick Cave, and after further travels in France he passed his Royal Institute of British Architects (RIBA) qualifying exam in 1911. He was awarded RIBA's 1914 British School at Rome scholarship. During the First World War, he served in the Royal Engineers.

After the war, he returned to working as an architect. Architectural historians the Lingards describe him as "one of the finest architectural draughtsmen of his day". One of his works from this period was L'Usine (1922), described by the Lingards as "a utopian industrial city scene" with "influences of early Futurism". Hepworth produced the design for the Lloyds Bank branch in Southwark that opened in 1928. In the design, he used "rusticated stone up to the sills of the first-floor windows and red brick in Flemish bond for the remaining two storeys, surmounted by a hipped roof clad in pantiles." Another early design was that of an arts-and-crafts thatched house named 'Bolton Muir' (1930) in Gifford, East Lothian.

== Pre-war and municipal work ==
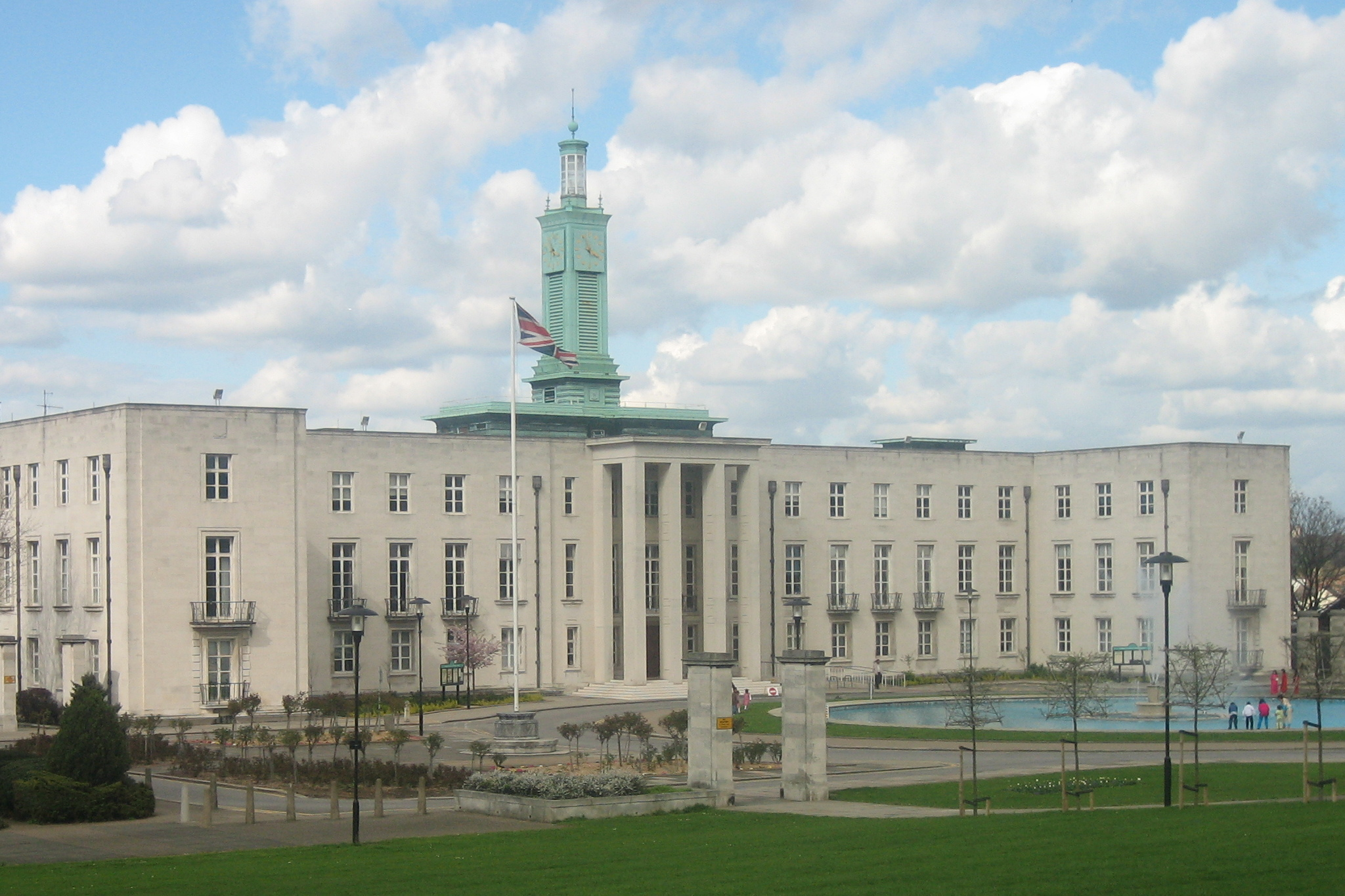
Walthamstow Town Hall (1942)

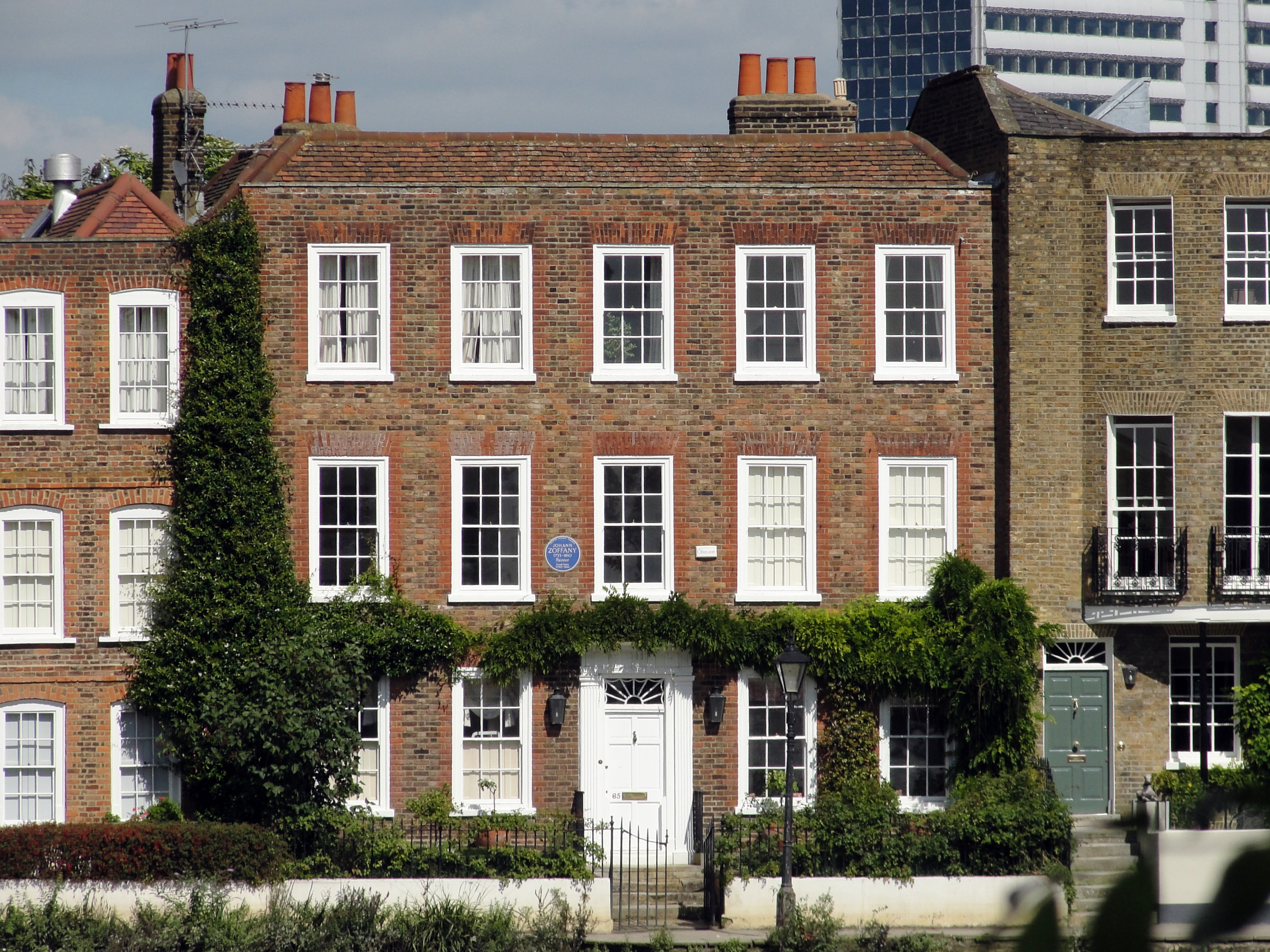
Hepworth's residence at Zoffany House

In 1931, Hepworth was featured in a book by architectural critic Trystan Edwards. Published in Zug, Switzerland, this 91-page hardback book, part of a series on the leading architects of the day, was titled Some recent work of Philip Hepworth. It was illustrated mostly with black-and-white photographs of the buildings designed by Hepworth. The embossed clothbound cover shows the Roof Garden House in Bickley, with the cover artwork described in 2015 by RIBA's British Architectural Library as "[an] image charged with the energetic spirit of Art Deco".

Hepworth won a major municipal architectural commission in the 1930s with his design for Walthamstow Town Hall (now known as Waltham Forest Town Hall). Built from 1937 to 1942, this complex of buildings is also known as Walthamstow Civic Centre and the commission was awarded to Hepworth in 1932 following an architectural competition launched in 1929 by the newly created municipal borough of Walthamstow. The building became Grade II listed on 9 March 1982.

Hepworth's design of Walthamstow Town Hall (and associated buildings) was described by architectural historian Nikolaus Pevsner in 1954 as in "the Swedish style of c.1925 which became so popular in England amongst those who were not satisfied to be imitatively Neo-Georgian nor wanted to go modern or earnest."

From 1936, Hepworth lived in and restored Zoffany House in Strand-on-the-Green, Chiswick, London, formerly the home of the 18th-century painter Johan Zoffany. Zoffany House was listed as Grade II* on 11 July 1951. Hepworth also designed County Hall in Trowbridge (begun in 1938 and finished in 1940). Around the start of World War II, Hepworth designed a Roman Catholic church in Wales, paid for by the Hon. Fflorens Roch, (wife of Walter Roch and daughter of Lord Treowen). This is Our Lady of Peace (1939–40) at Newbridge, now a Grade II* listed building, with a large campanile. This church was granted Grade II* listed status on 17 March 1999.

== World War II and CWGC ==
In World War II, as he was too old for active service, Hepworth served in the Home Guard. During the war, he was appointed to the Royal Academy of Arts' Planning Committee for the rebuilding of London following the damage caused during the Blitz. This committee was chaired by Sir Edwin Lutyens, who was a good friend of Hepworth.

In 1944, Hepworth was appointed the Principal Architect for North-West Europe for the Imperial War Graves Commission (later the Commonwealth War Graves Commission [CWGC]). Other Principal Architects appointed by the Commission to take on the task of designing a new set of memorials and cemeteries after World War II included Sir Hubert Worthington and Sir Edward Maufe. Hepworth designed post-World War II CWGC cemeteries in Normandy, France, as well as in Belgium, the Netherlands and Germany. The CWGC memorials he designed were the Dunkirk Memorial (1957) to the missing of the British Expeditionary Force that fell at the start of the war during the fall of France, and the Bayeux Memorial (1955) to the missing of the British forces that fell in the Normandy Campaign in the liberation of France.

The CWGC cemeteries he designed included the Berlin 1939–1945 War Cemetery, Becklingen War Cemetery, Bény-sur-Mer Canadian War Cemetery, and Groesbeek Canadian War Cemetery. Others were Brouay War Cemetery (Brouay), Tilly-sur-Seulles War Cemetery (Bayeux), La Délivrande War Cemetery (Douvres-la-Délivrande), Jerusalem War Cemetery (Chouain), Ranville War Cemetery (Banneville-la-Campagne), Bretteville-sur-Laize Canadian War Cemetery, Kiel War Cemetery (Kiel), Rheinberg War Cemetery and Reichswald Forest War Cemetery (Klever Reichswald). Hepworth planned the layout of his cemeteries only after intensive consultations with gardeners.

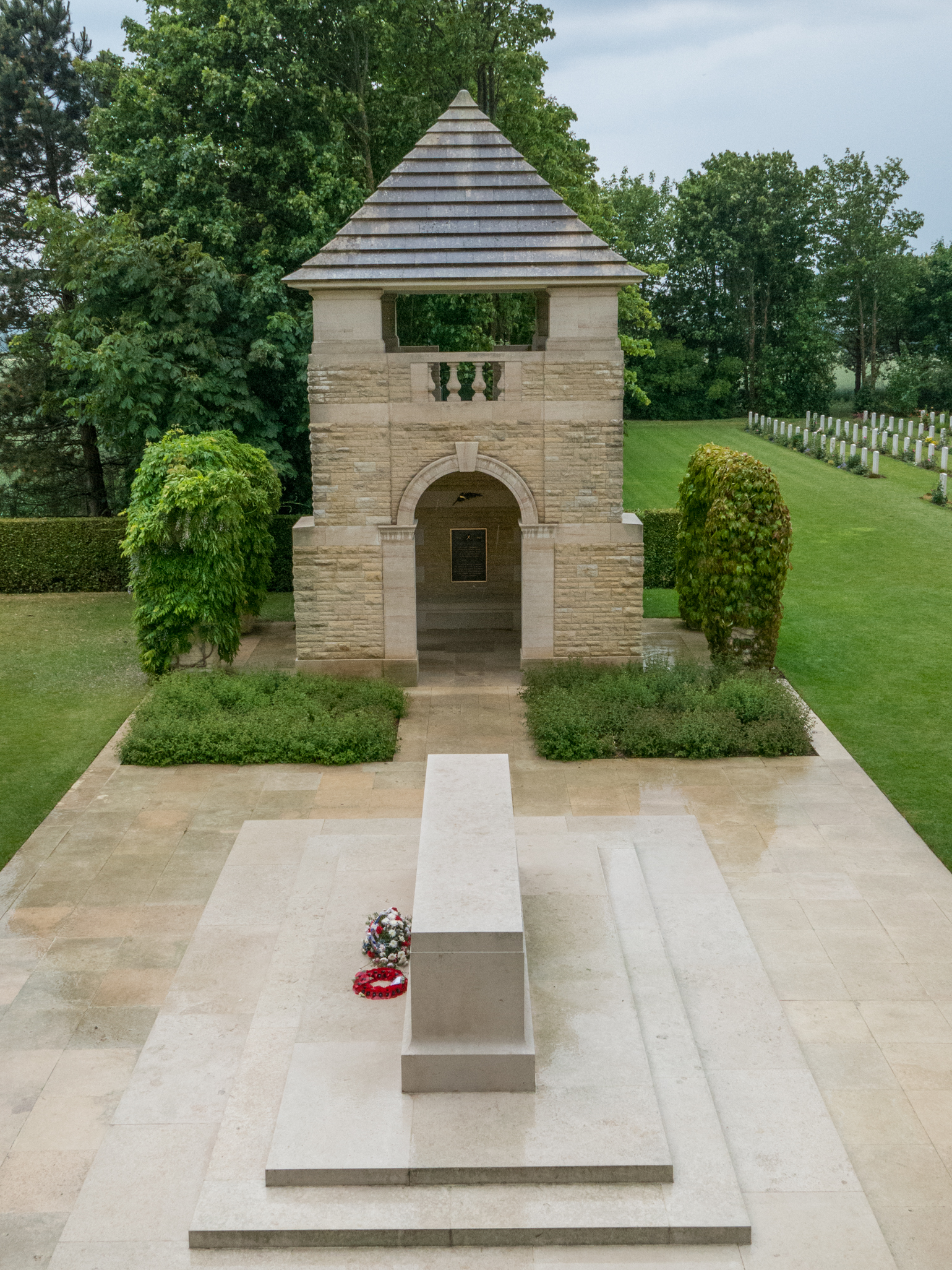
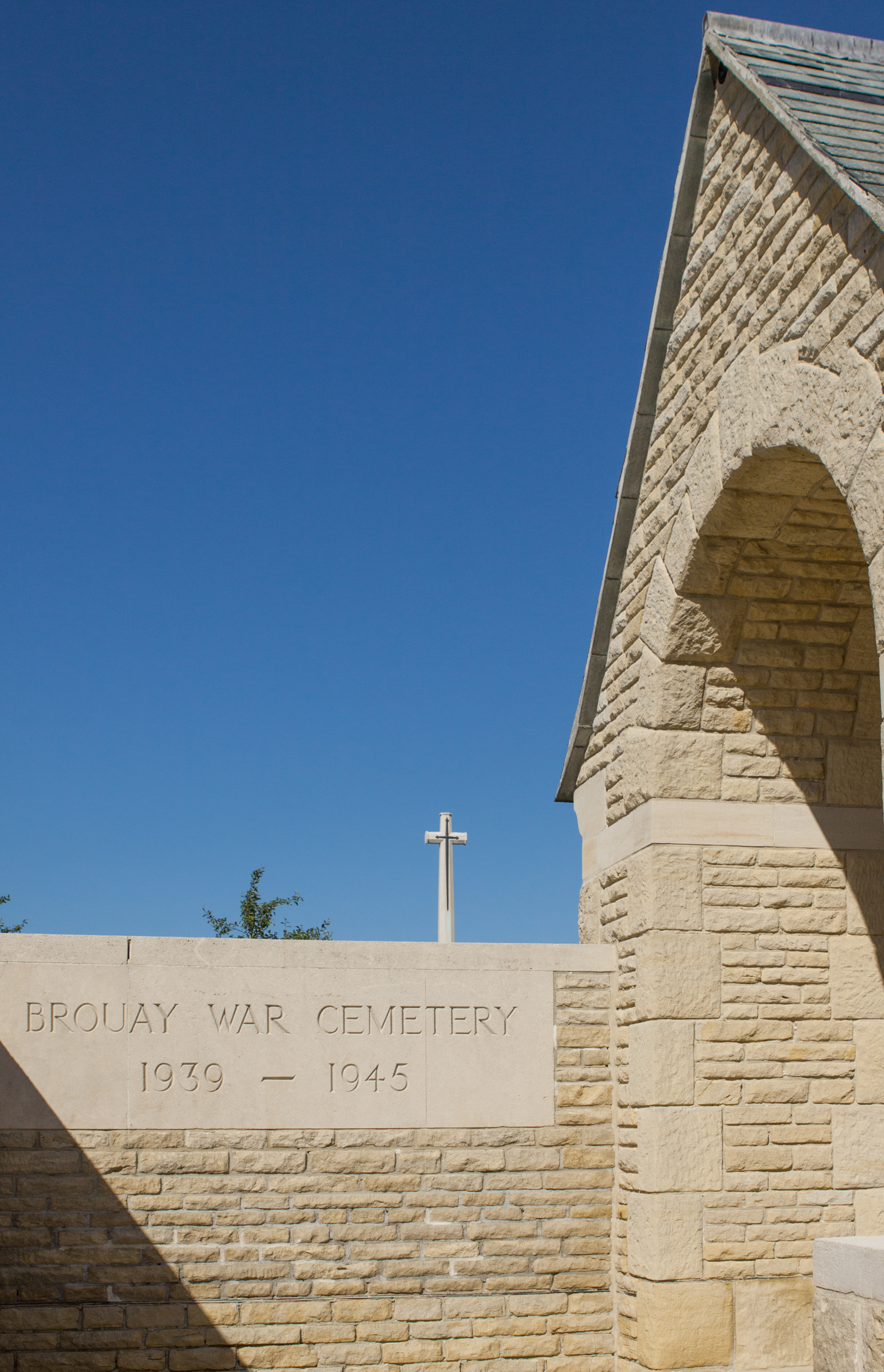
One of the watchtowers (left) at Bény-sur-Mer Canadian War Cemetery and the entrance (right) to Brouay War Cemetery

Historian Philip Longworth, author of a history of the Commission, gave his view on Hepworth's Commission work in a 1963 obituary:

Hepworth, another Beaux-Arts man, was an architect of great speed and brilliance, a man of sensitivity and eccentricity, whose work, though careful and often witty in detail, sometimes lacked total cohesion through dint of pressures to economise. Rarely modernistic, he was influenced by classical, English and local Norman styles, and was probably the most obvious follower of his predecessors. His cemetery at Brouay has a gabled barrel-vaulted entrance reminiscent of Baker's work, and there is more than a hint of Lutyens in his watch-towers at Beny-sur-Mer.

— Philip Longworth, The Builder, 1 March 1963

== Final years ==
Hepworth died in a London hospital on 21 February 1963. Obituaries were published in volume 70 of the RIBA Journal and in volume 204 of The Builder.

== Architectural works ==
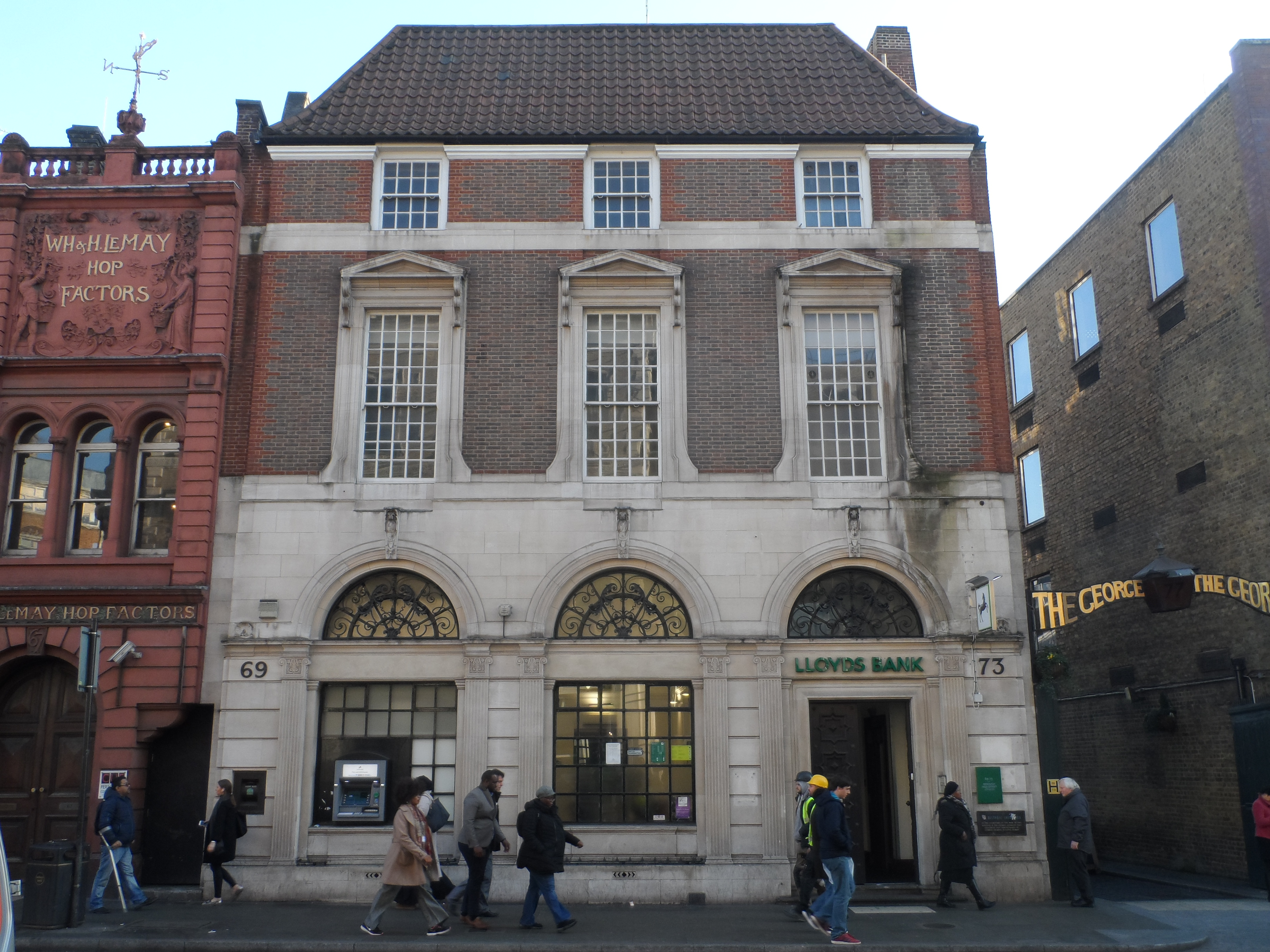
Lloyds Bank, Southwark (1928)

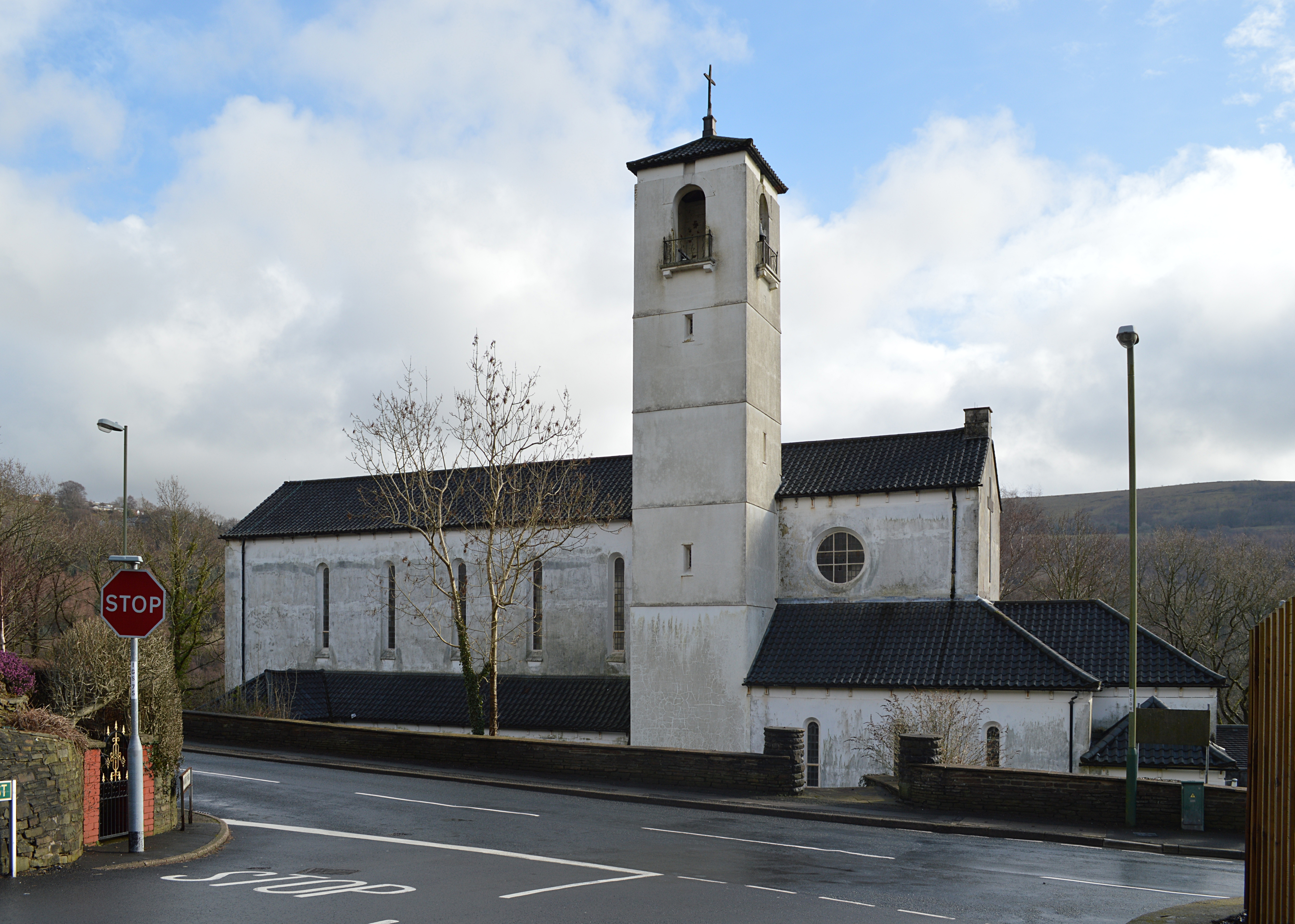
Our Lady of Peace at Newbridge (1939–40)

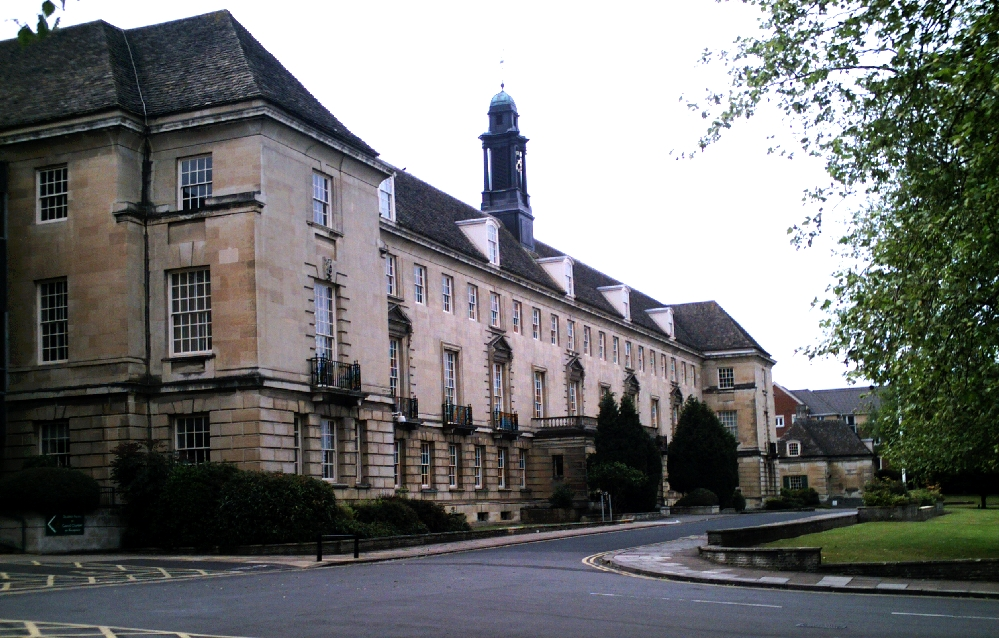
Wiltshire County Hall (1940)

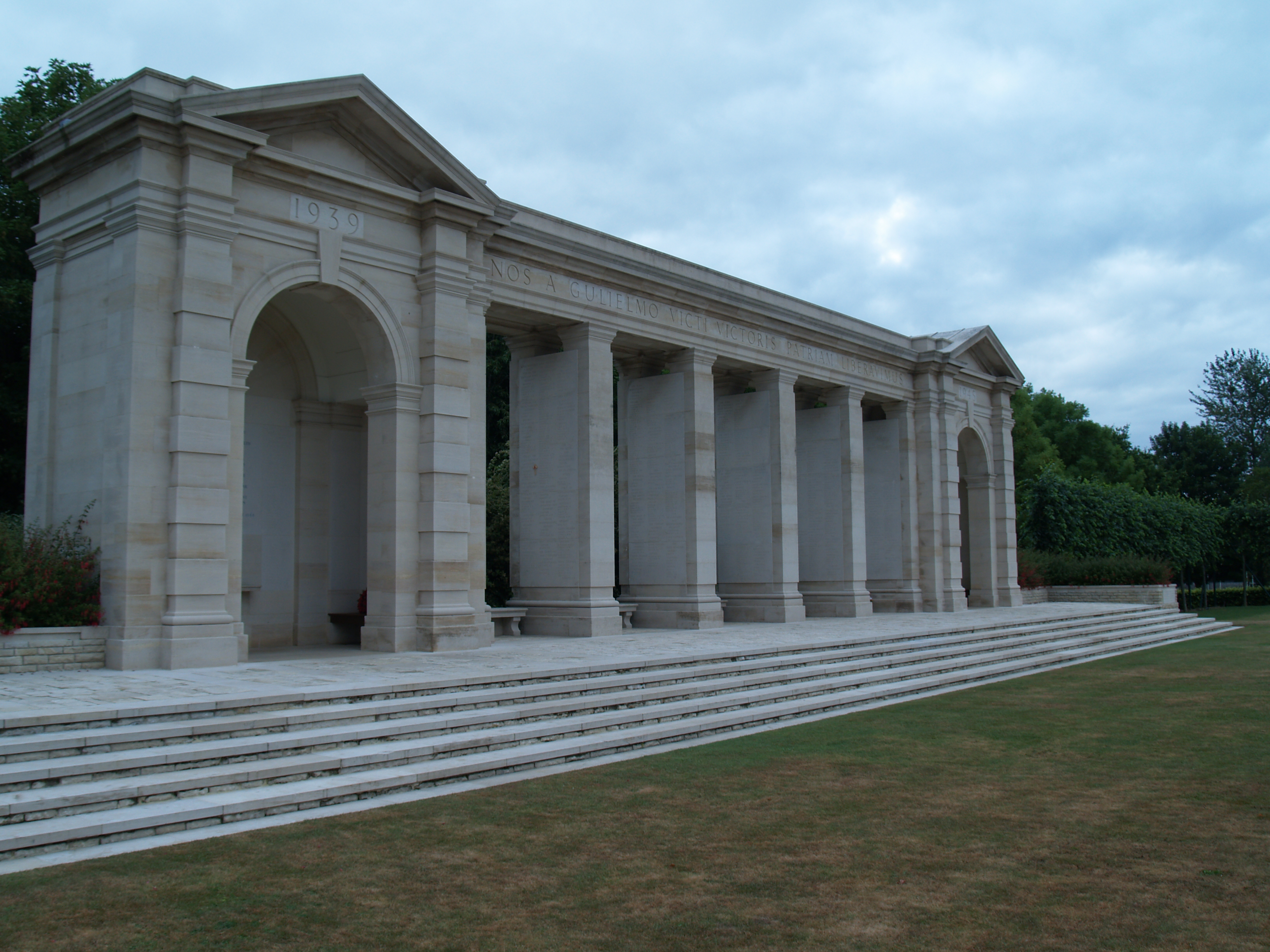
Bayeux Memorial (1955), Normandy, France

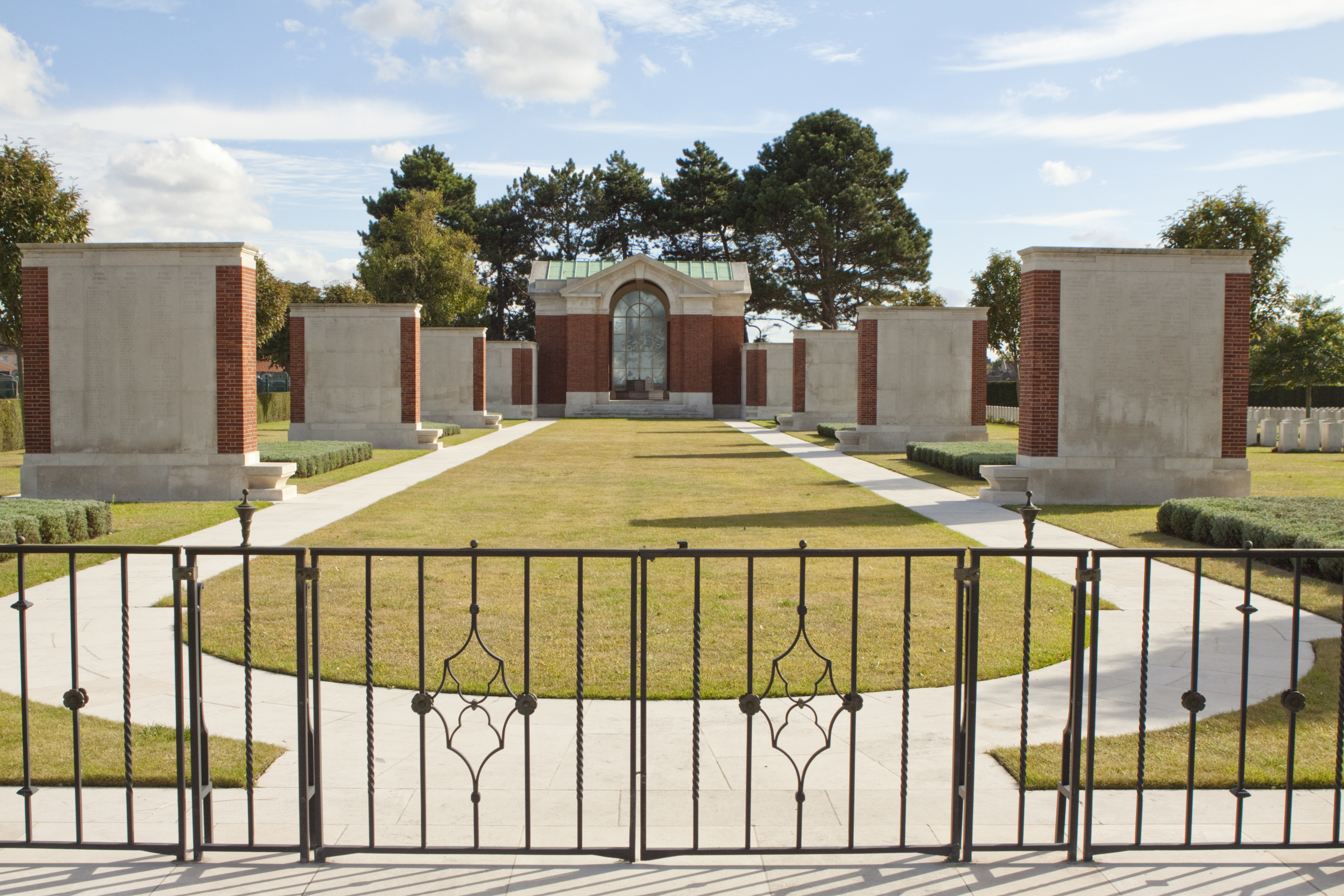
Dunkirk Memorial (1957), Normandy, France

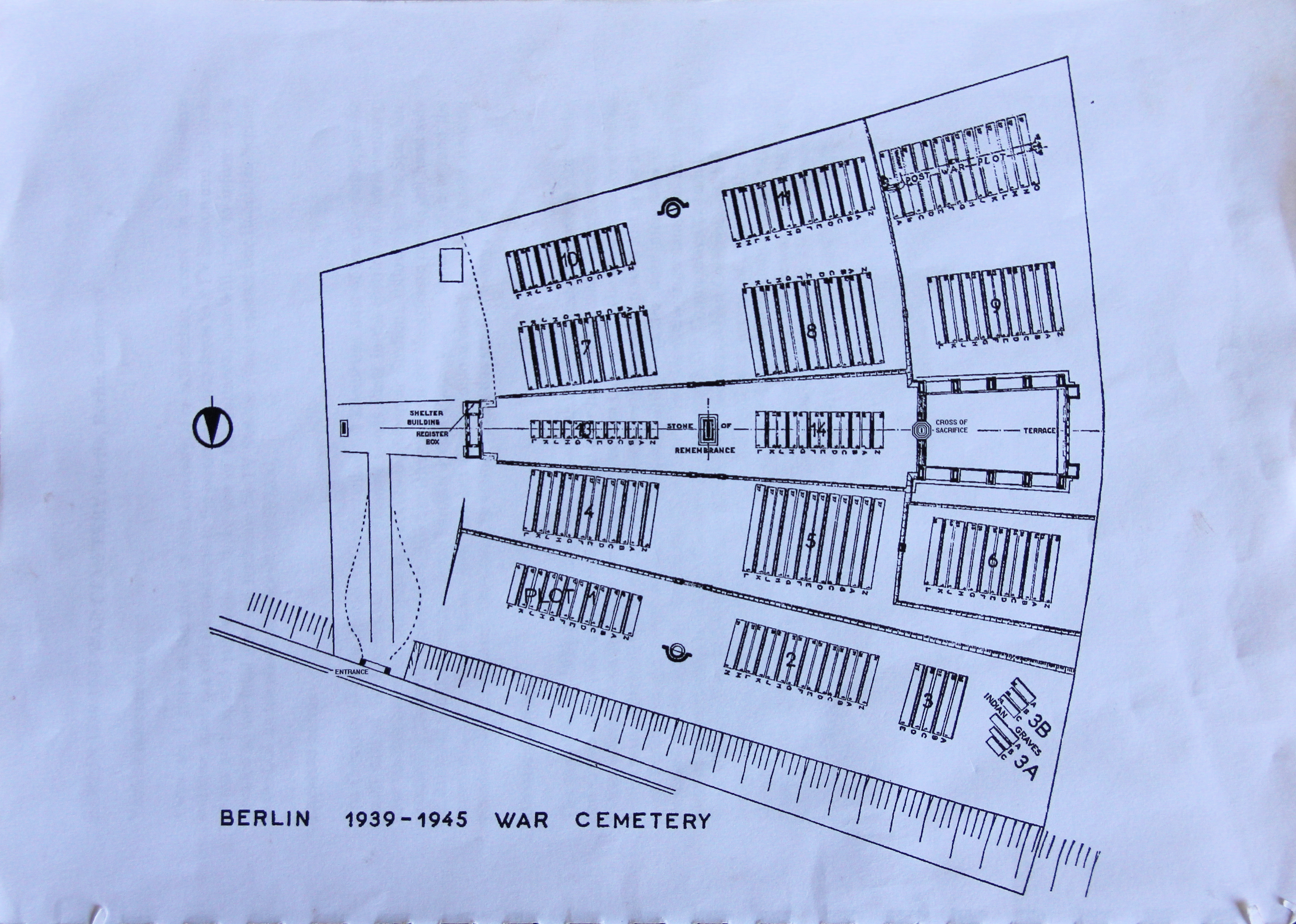
Plan for Berlin 1939-1945 War Cemetery

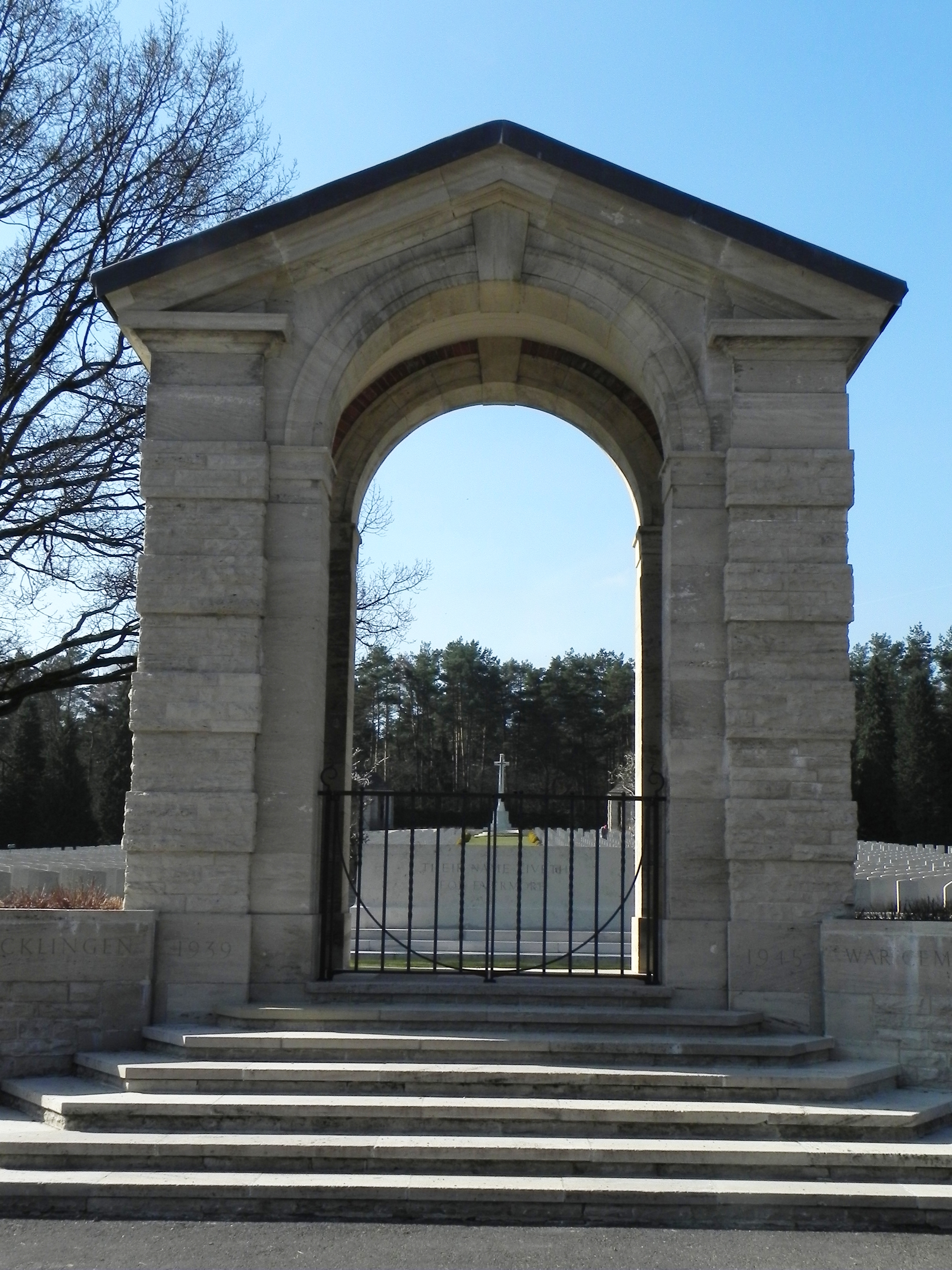
Entrance to Becklingen War Cemetery

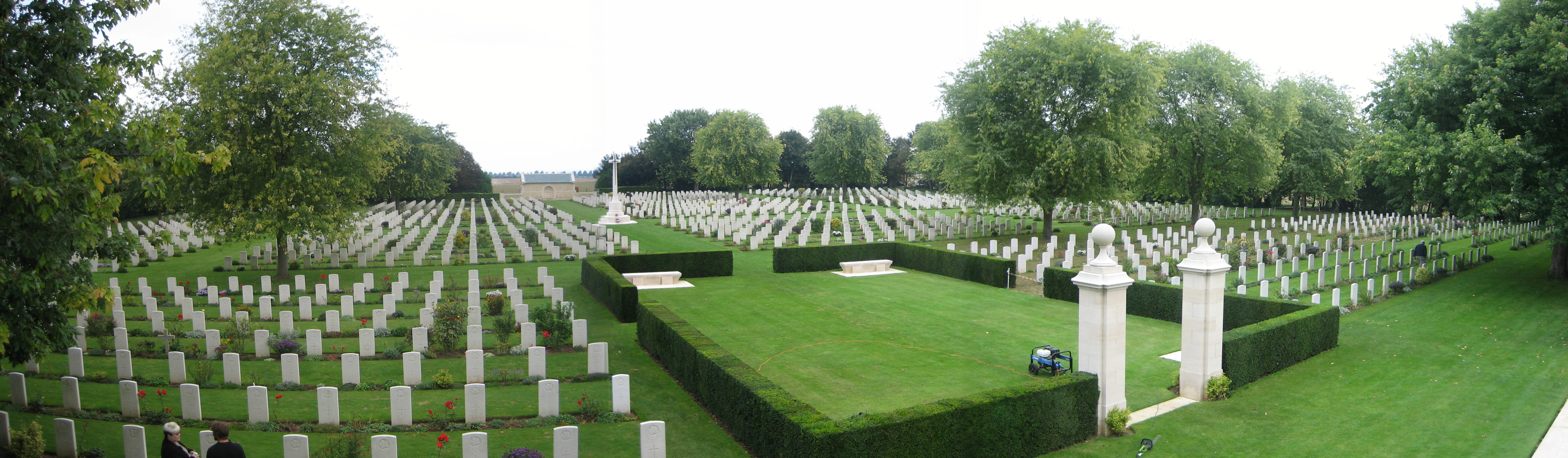
Panoramic view of Bény-sur-Mer Canadian War Cemetery

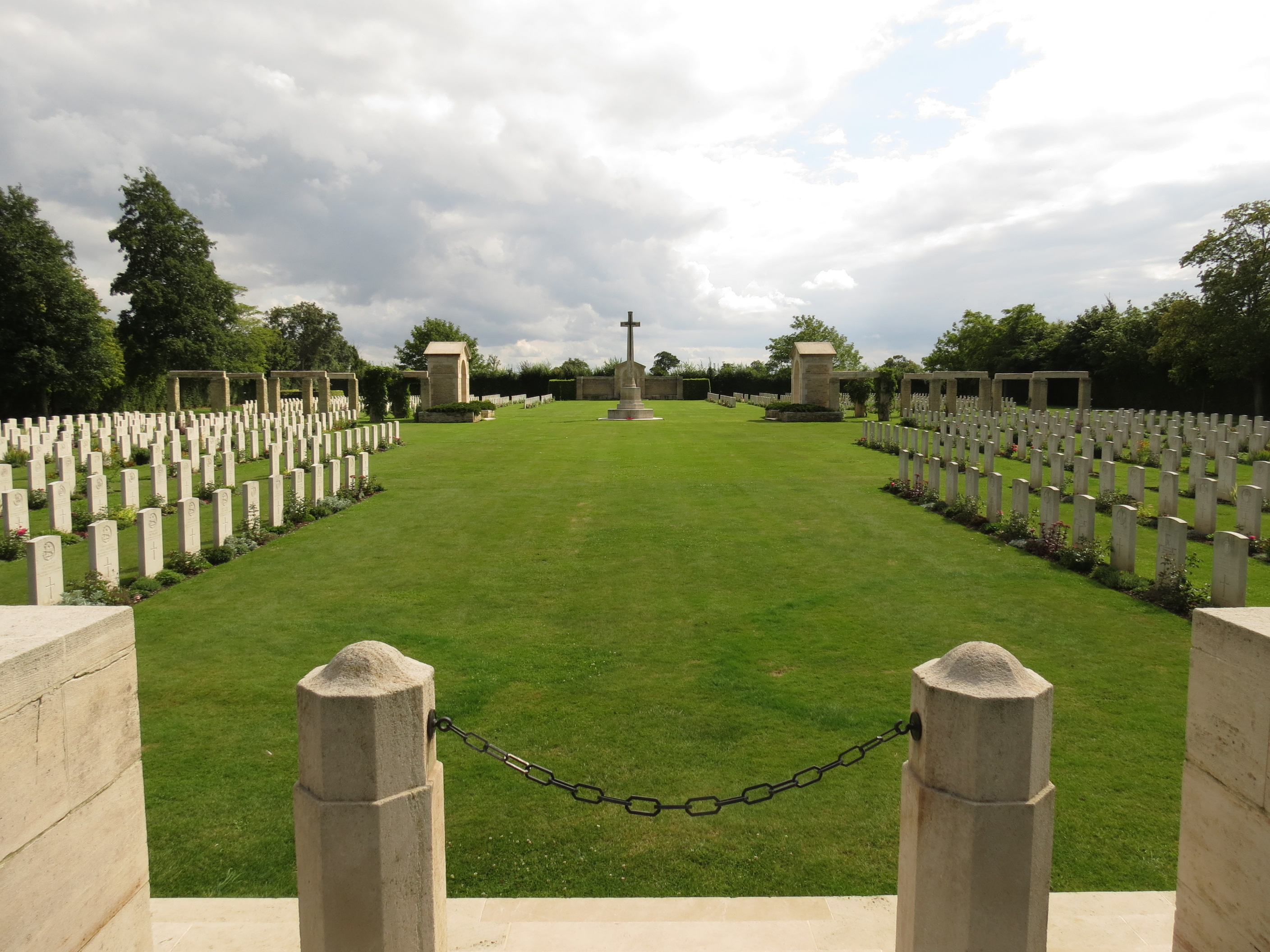
Avenue to Cross of Sacrifice at Tilly-sur-Seulles War Cemetery

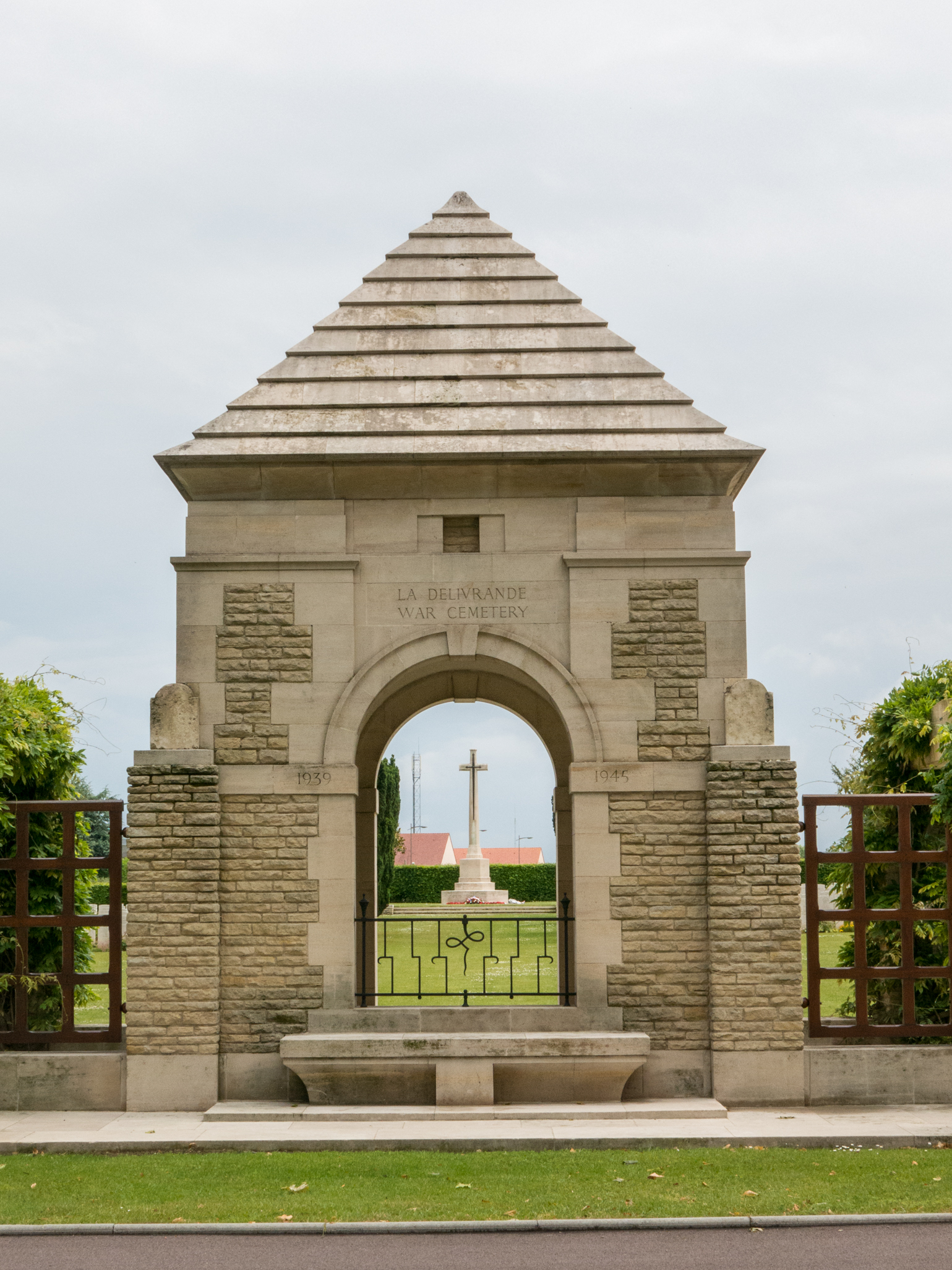
Entrance to La Délivrande War Cemetery

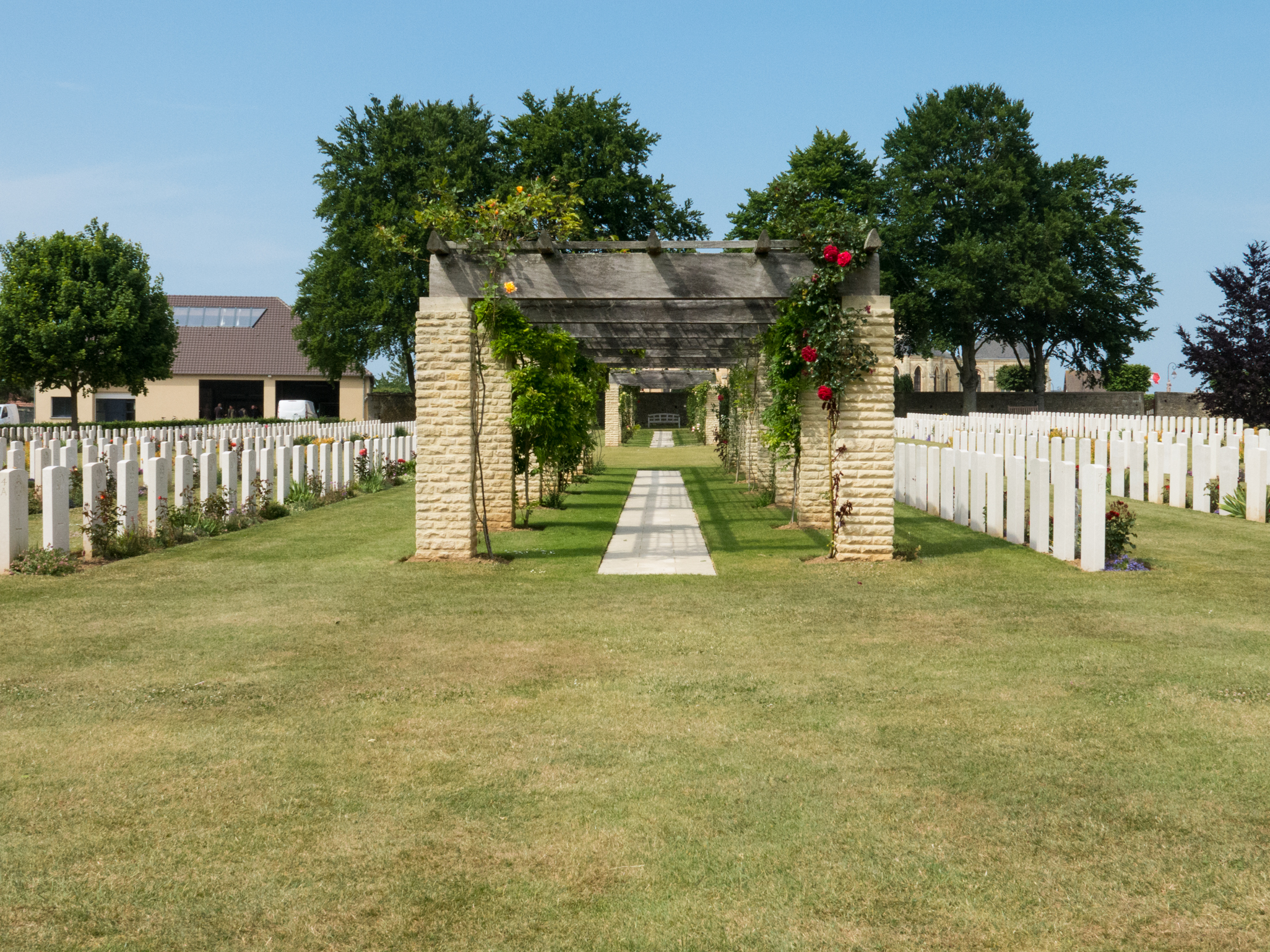
Walkway at Ranville War Cemetery

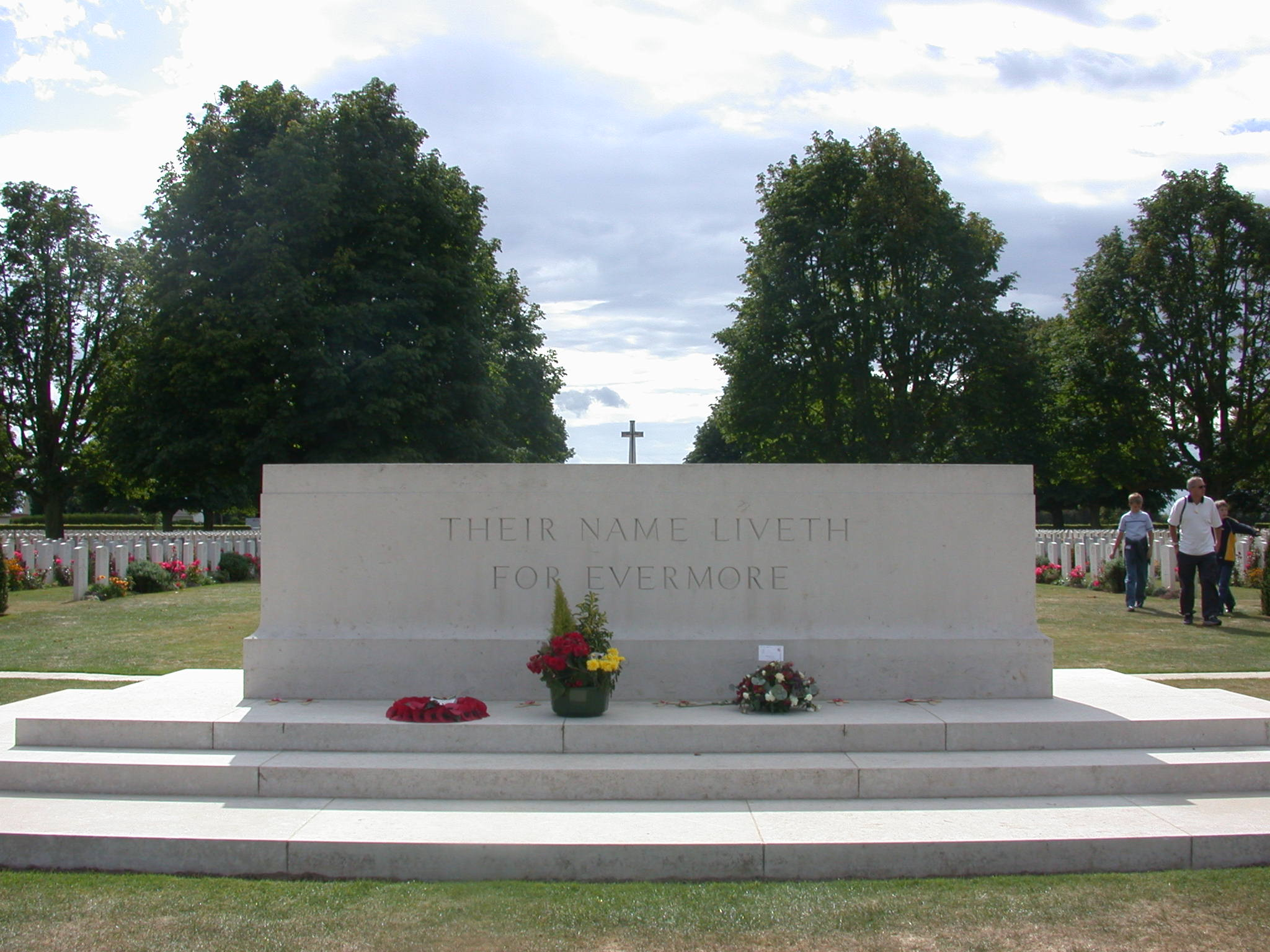
Stone of Remembrance at Bretteville-sur-Laize Cemetery

Groesbeek Canadian War Cemetery

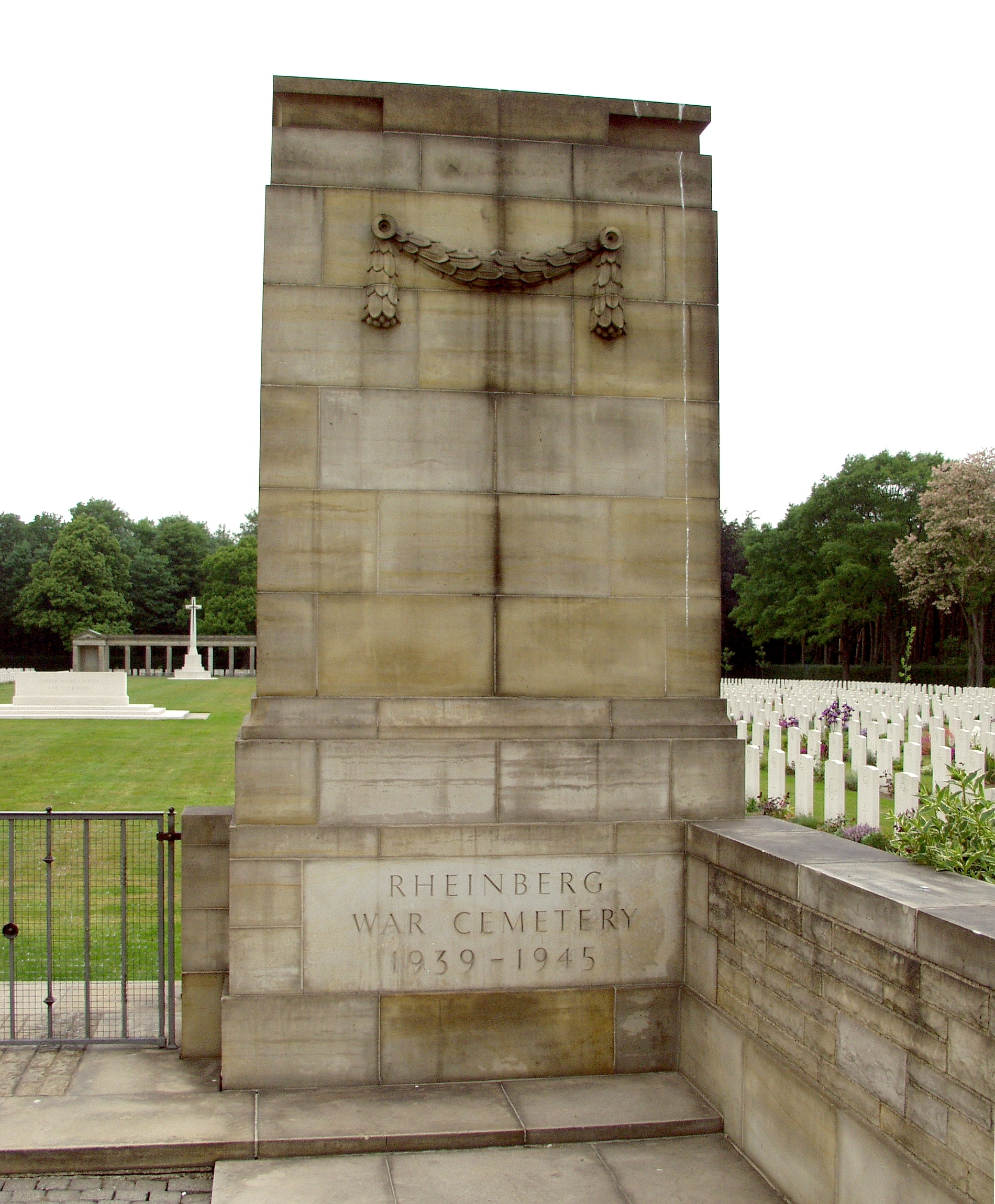
Entrance pillar at Rheinberg War Cemetery

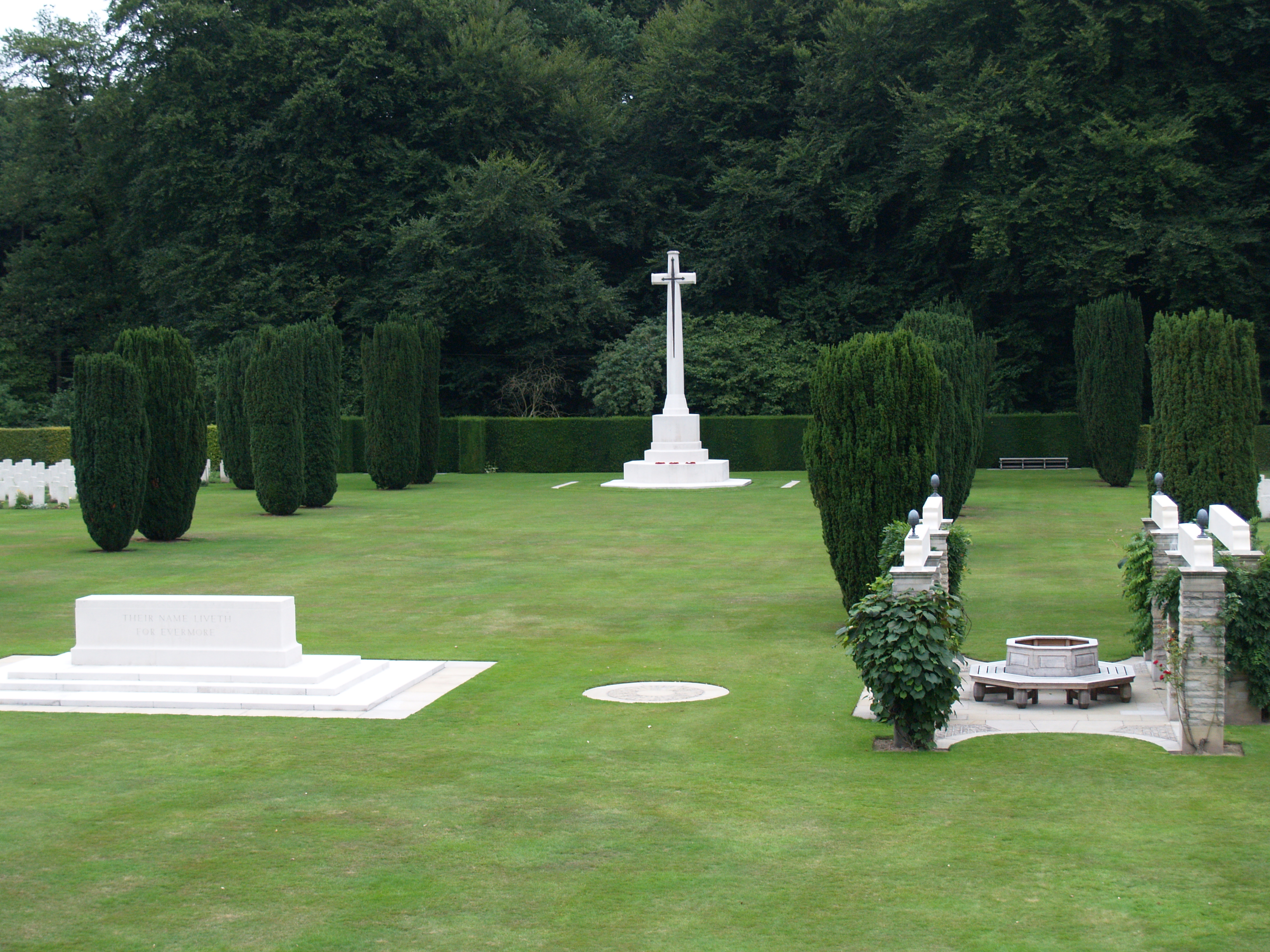
Principal axis of Reichswald Forest War Cemetery
