= Friedhof =

Friedhof is German for cemetery. See:

- List of cemeteries in Germany
  - List of cemeteries in Berlin
    - Städtischer Friedhof III
    - Weißensee Cemetery
    - Zentralfriedhof Friedrichsfelde
- Friedhof Fluntern, Fluntern Cemetery, Zürich, Switzerland
- Friedhof von Ziegelskoppel, Kopli cemetery, Kopli, Estonia

== See also ==
- Hugo Friedhofer
