= Berlin 1939–1945 War Cemetery =

Cemetery

- Commonwealth War Graves Commission
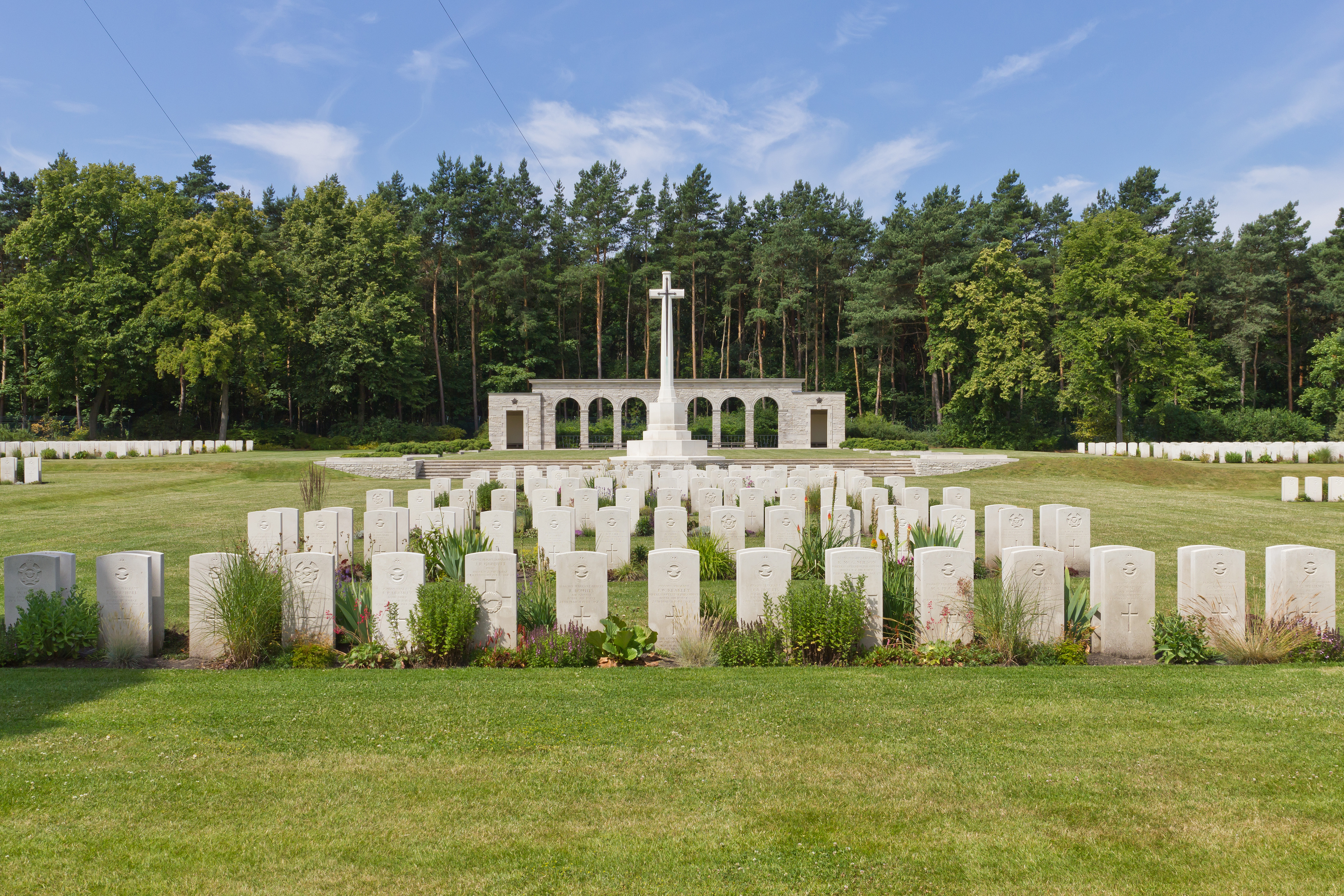
- Used for those deceased 1939–1945
- Established: 1945 (concentration cemetery)
- Location: 52°30′26″N 13°13′16″E near Charlottenburg, 8 km west of Berlin, Germany
- Designed by: Philip Hepworth
- Total burials: 3,594
- Unknowns: 397

Burials by nation
- United Kingdom & Commonwealth

Burials by war
- World War II

The Berlin 1939–1945 War Cemetery is one of two Commonwealth War Graves Commission (CWGC) cemeteries in Berlin, the other being the World War I Stahnsdorf South-Western Cemetery in Stahnsdorf, Brandenburg. The Berlin 1939–1945 War Cemetery was established in 1945 as a central burial ground for aircrew and prisoners of war who were interred in the Berlin area and in East Germany. There are also 260 burials from the post-war British Occupation Authorities staff, or their relatives. Of the wartime burials, about 80% are aircrew, killed in action over Germany: the remainder are prisoners of war.

== History ==
The British War Cemetery, Heerstrasse, was constructed between 1955 and 1957 to replace the previous cemetery at the Trakehner Allee, which had to be demolished in 1959. The former site was intended to be used for the erection of a television tower, although this never came to pass. The soldiers buried there were transferred to the new Heerstrasse site.

The new cemetery was constructed according to plans by Philip Dalton Hepworth on an approximately 3.8-hectare (9.4-acre) site. The arrangement reflected that of other British war cemeteries, in particular the uniform headstones of Portland stone, the Cross of Sacrifice and centrally placed Stone of Remembrance with inscription (Their name liveth for evermore), and short-cut lawns. The entrance is formed of three limestone arches with wrought iron gates.

As with the other British war cemeteries in Germany, the cemetery at Heerstrasse is administered by the CWGC. The majority of those interred there were members of the Royal Air Force who were killed during attacks on Berlin, alongside British soldiers who died in captivity in Germany and some civilian members of the post-1945 British occupation forces. As well as Britons, there are soldiers from other Commonwealth realms, soldiers of unknown nationalities and five Poles. In total there are 3,576 graves in the cemetery. The cemetery itself lies under the protection of the British Crown, and in this sense belongs to the territory of the United Kingdom.

== See also ==
- List of cemeteries in Berlin
