= Brouay War Cemetery =

Military cemetery in Normandy

- Commonwealth War Graves Commission
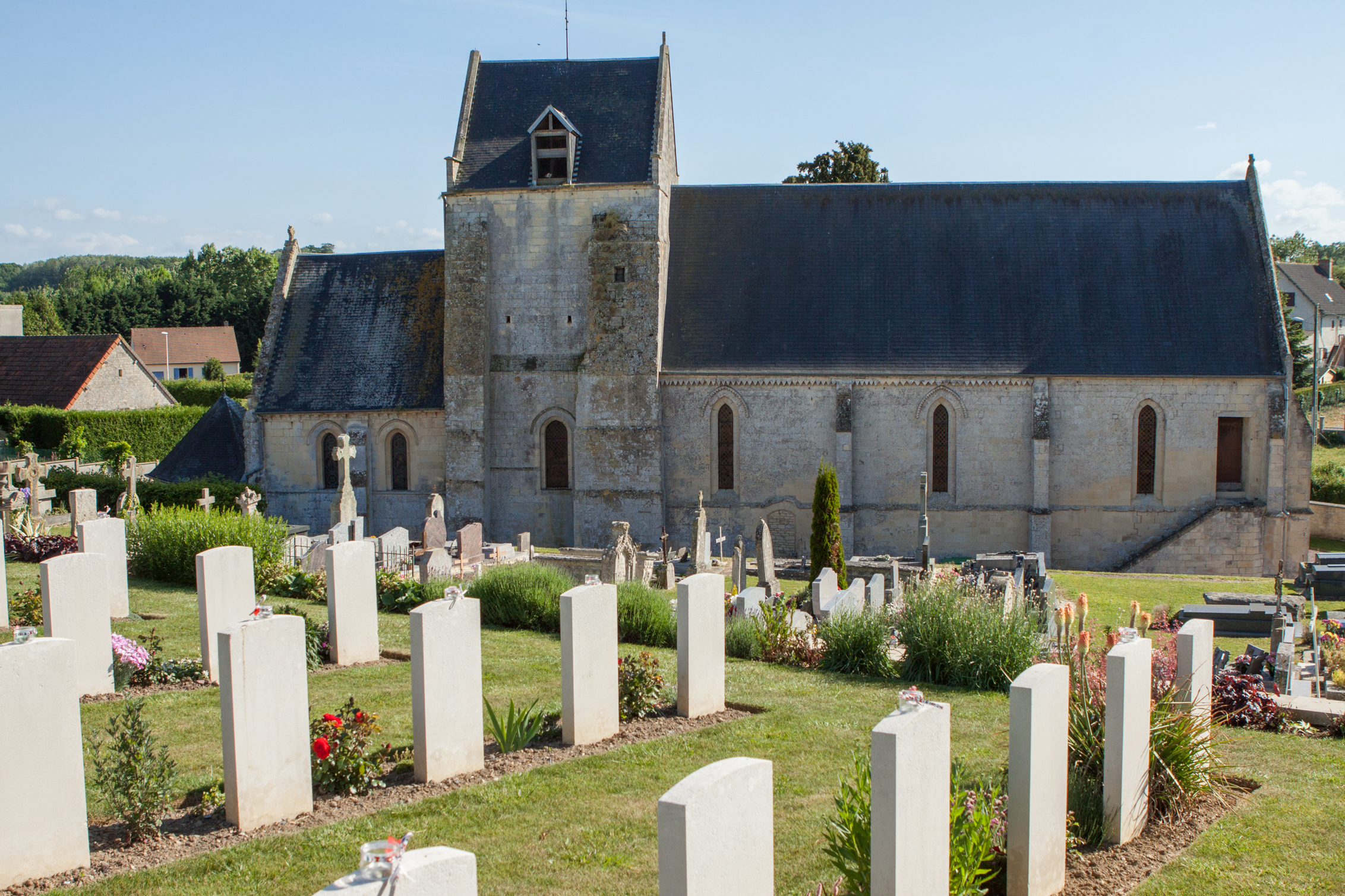
- Brouay war cemetery adjacent to Brouay Church
- For Operation Overlord
- Established: 1944
- Location: 49.2148°N 0.5619°W near Brouay, Calvados, France
- Designed by: Philip D. Hepworth
- Total burials: 370
- Unknowns: 7

Burials by nation
- United Kingdom: 368; Canada: 2

Burials by war
- World War II

Brouay War Cemetery is a Second World War cemetery of Commonwealth soldiers in France, located between Caen and Bayeux, Normandy. The cemetery contains 377 graves, of which 7 are unidentified. The cemetery is adjacent to the commune's graveyard.

== History ==
During the Allies push out of the Normandy bridgeheads, a key target was the taking of Caen. The majority of those interred in the cemetery were killed in heavy fighting in late June and July 1944 as the Allies encircled Caen.

== Location ==
The cemetery is midway between Bayeux and Caen, in the Calvados department, on the Route d'Audrieu (D.94). It is located 3.25 kilometres southeast of Bayeux. Access is via some steps at the eastern corner of Brouay Church.

== Photographs ==
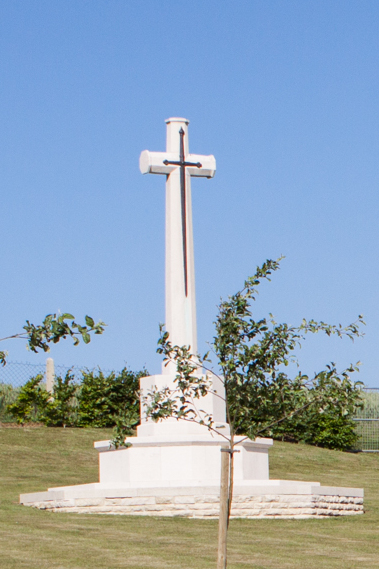
Sacrificial cross in Brouay war cemetery

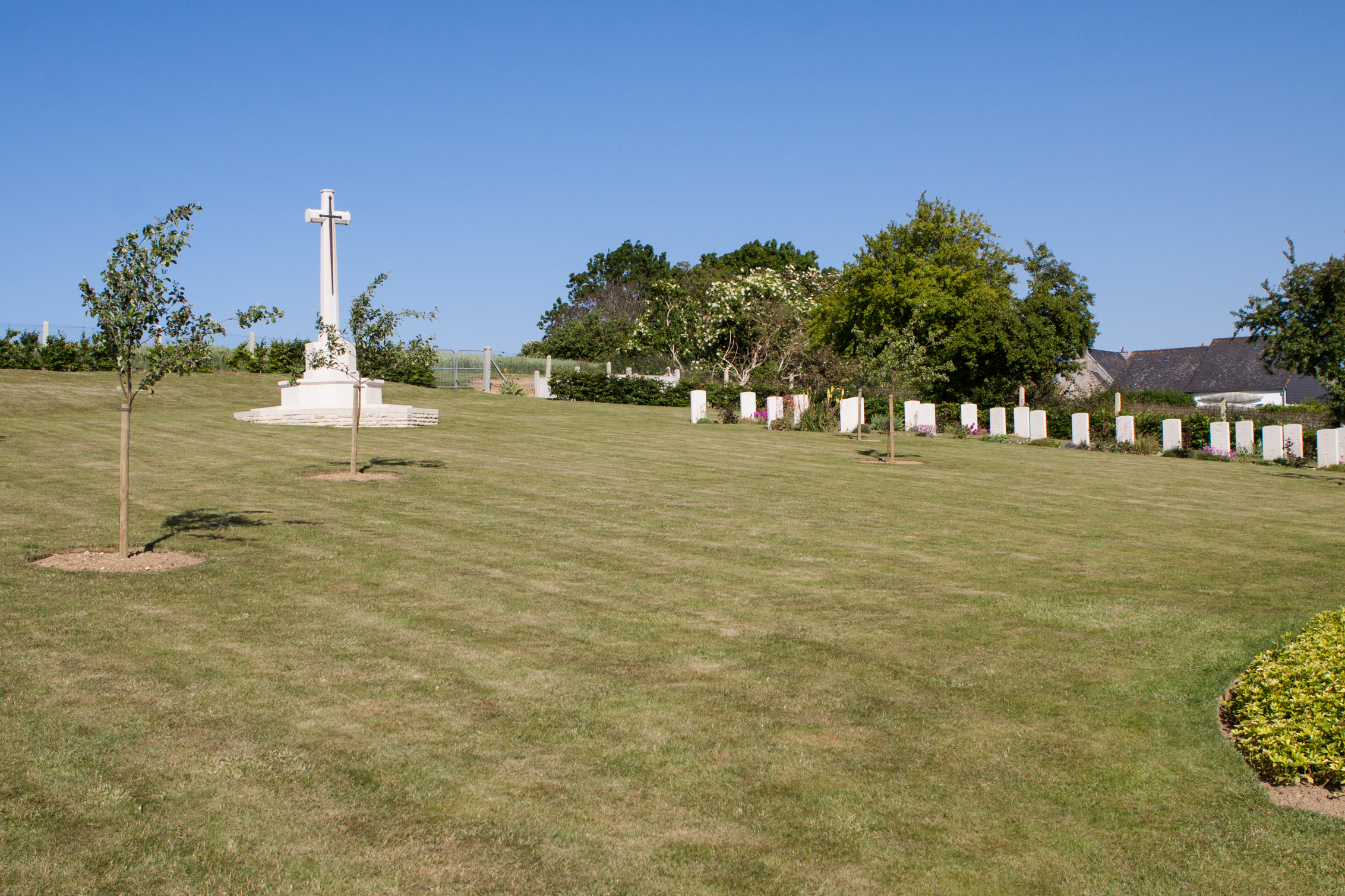
Brouay war cemetery

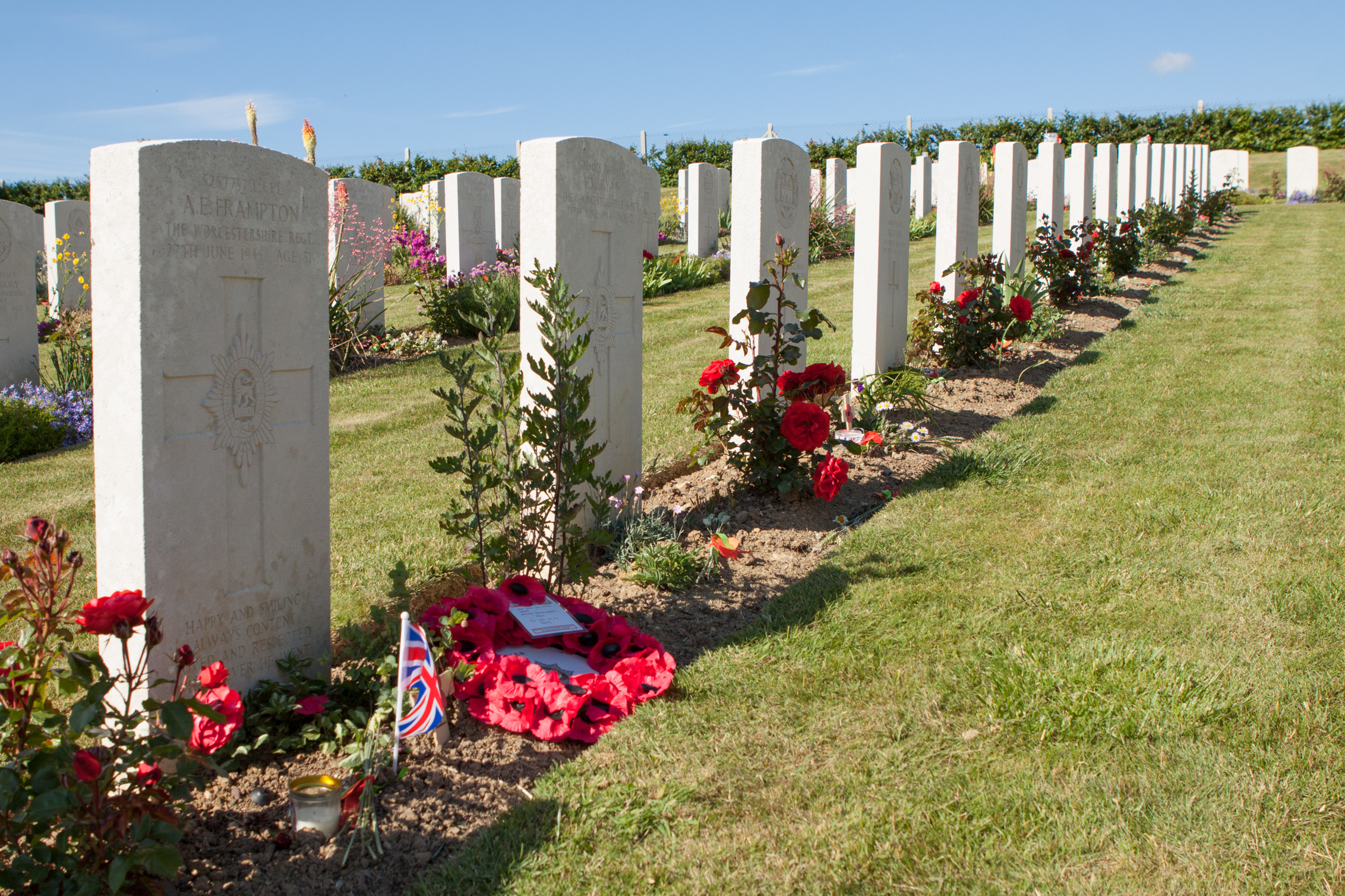
Graves in the cemetery

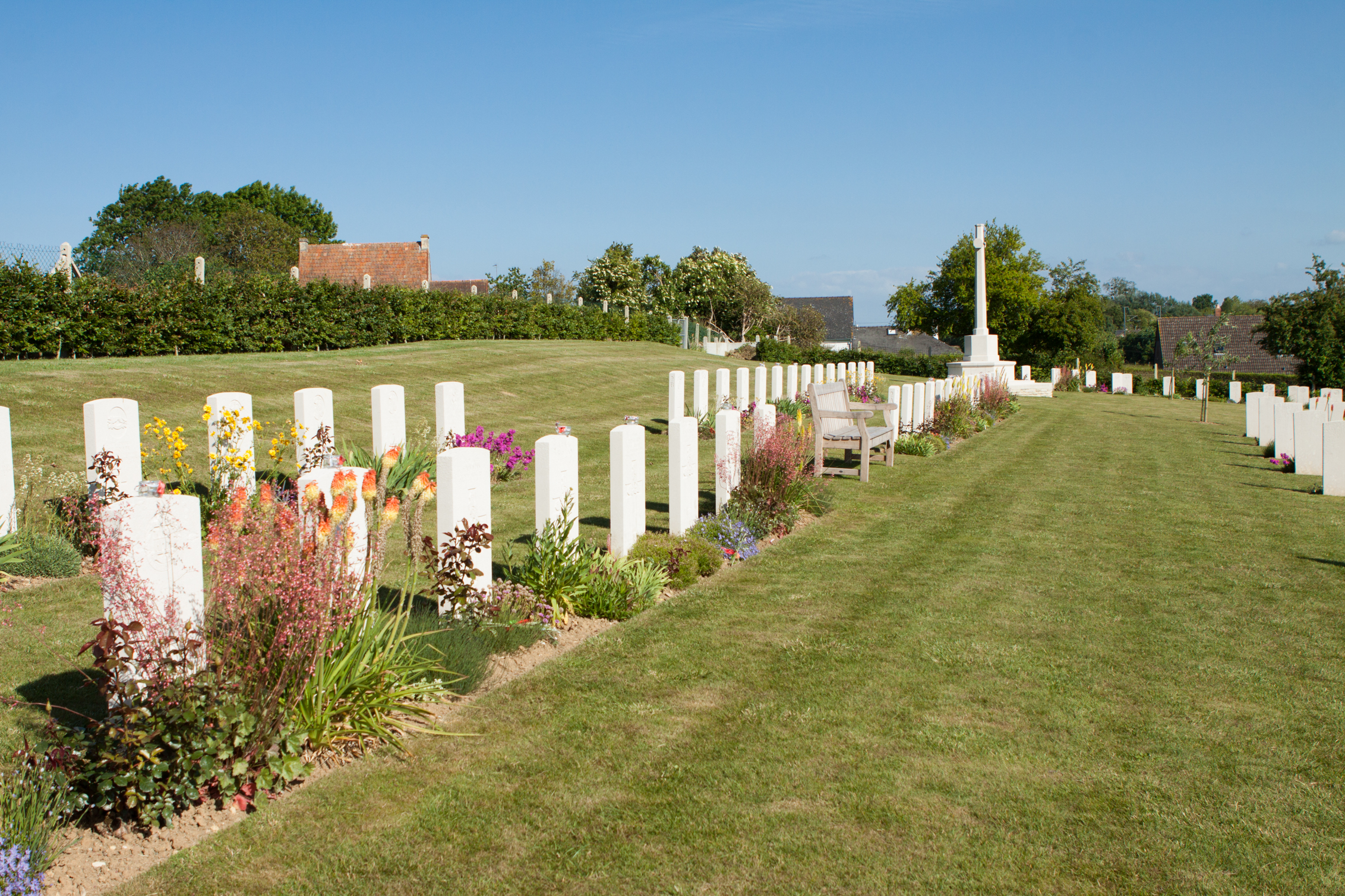
Graves and cross in the cemetery

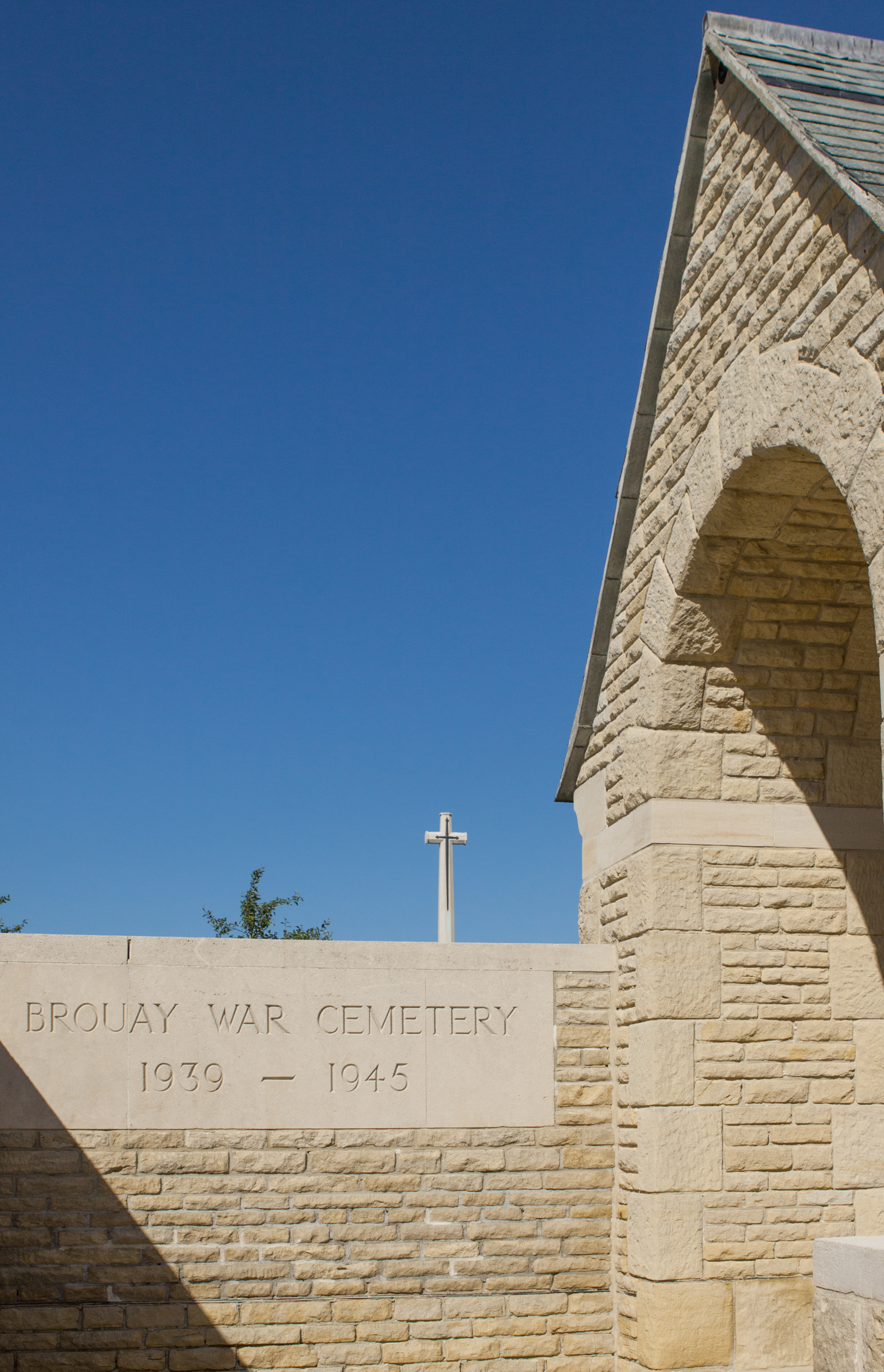
Entrance to Brouay war cemetery

== See also ==
- American Battle Monuments Commission
- UK National Inventory of War Memorials
- German War Graves Commission
- List of military cemeteries in Normandy
