= Jakob Geis =

Jakob Geis, stage name Papa Geis (27 December 1840, in Munich – 3 March 1908, in Munich) was a German performer, folksinger, and musical director. He was considered a master of Bavarian cuplés. The dramatist and director Jacob Geis was his grandchild.

Originally he wanted to become a Catholic priest. But at the age of 26, he broke off his theological studies and started a stage career as a comedian in Vienna. He wore only black clothes, a bit like a Catholic priest. Often he was greeted therefore as a Father. His stage name Papa Geis means Daddy Geis.

In 1878 he started his own musical and comedian group, named Gesellschaft Geis. His cuplés reflect a piece of cultural history of Munich.

== Discography ==
- CD "Rare Schellacks - München: Volkssänger", by Trikont (Best.Nr. US 0199), including the "Bachstelzenlied" from Papa Geis.

1902 Papa Geis recorded five couplés by "Gramophone Co.":

- G&T 42 230 (mx. 594) Kalauer-Couplet (music: Julius Einödshofer)
- G&T 42 231 (mx. 596) Daradl-Dadl (text: Krakauer)
- G&T 42 232 (mx. 593) Travestie über das "Bachstelzenlied" (Tit-willow) (music: W.S.Gilbert)
- G&T 42 233 (mx. 592) Couplet mit Opern-Refrain
- G&T 42 234 (mx. 594) Durchs Schlüsselloch (text: Verney)

== Selected bibliography ==
- Jakob Geis: Selbstbiographie. Typoskript München 1905.
