= Trystan Edwards =

Welsh architectural critic and town planner (1884-1973)

Arthur Trystan Edwards FRIBA FRTPI FRGS (10 November 1884 – 30 January 1973) was a Welsh architectural critic, town planner and amateur cartographer. He was a noted critic of the garden city movement.

Born in Merthyr Tydfil, he was educated at Clifton College, Bristol, and Hertford College, Oxford. He studied under the architect Sir Reginald Blomfield as an articled pupil from 1907 and was enrolled at the Liverpool School of Architecture's department of civic design from 1911 to 1913. In 1913 he returned to London and worked for the firm of Richardson and Gill; during this period his first architectural criticism was published in the Architects' and Builders' Journal. He served in the Royal Navy from 1915 to 1918 and continued his involvement with the Navy into peacetime, serving for twelve years in the Royal Naval Volunteer Reserve.

At the close of World War I Edwards joined the Ministry of Health and resumed his architectural criticism. The Things which are Seen: a Revaluation of the Visual Arts was published in 1921 and Good and Bad Manners in Architecture, which is considered to be his best work, in 1924. John Betjeman noted that the latter work was "the first book to draw attention after the Great War to Regency architecture and to deplore the destruction of Nash's Regent Street." In 1933 Edwards founded the Hundred New Towns Association, which was ultimately unsuccessful in its aims. In 1953 he published A New Map of the World, in which he proposed his "homalographic" projection.
