= Fritiof Karlsson =

Swedish politician

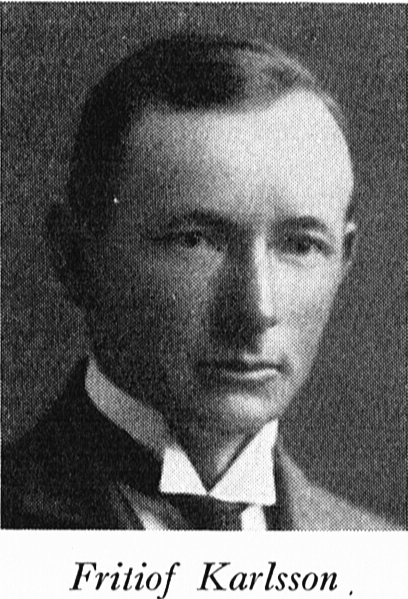

Fritiof Karlsson (1892–1984) was a Swedish politician. He was a member of the Centre Party.
