= Fridtjof Nansen (disambiguation) =

Fridtjof Nansen (1861-1930) was a Norwegian explorer, scientist, diplomat, humanitarian and Nobel laureate.

Various things were named in his honor:

- Fridtjof Nansen Institute, a research foundation established in Fridtjof Nansen's home
- Mount Fridtjof Nansen, a mountain in the Queen Maud Mountains of Antarctica
- HNoMS Fridtjof Nansen (1930), a patrol vessel of the Royal Norwegian Navy, active from 1931–1940
- HNoMS Fridtjof Nansen (F310), a Royal Norwegian Navy frigate of the Norwegian Navy, active 2006–present, and lead ship of the Fridtjof Nansen class frigates
- Fridtjof Nansen class frigate, a class of warships built for the Royal Norwegian Navy
