= Old Cemetery (Freiburg im Breisgau) =

Cemetery in Germany

Coordinates: 48°00′03″N 7°51′28″E

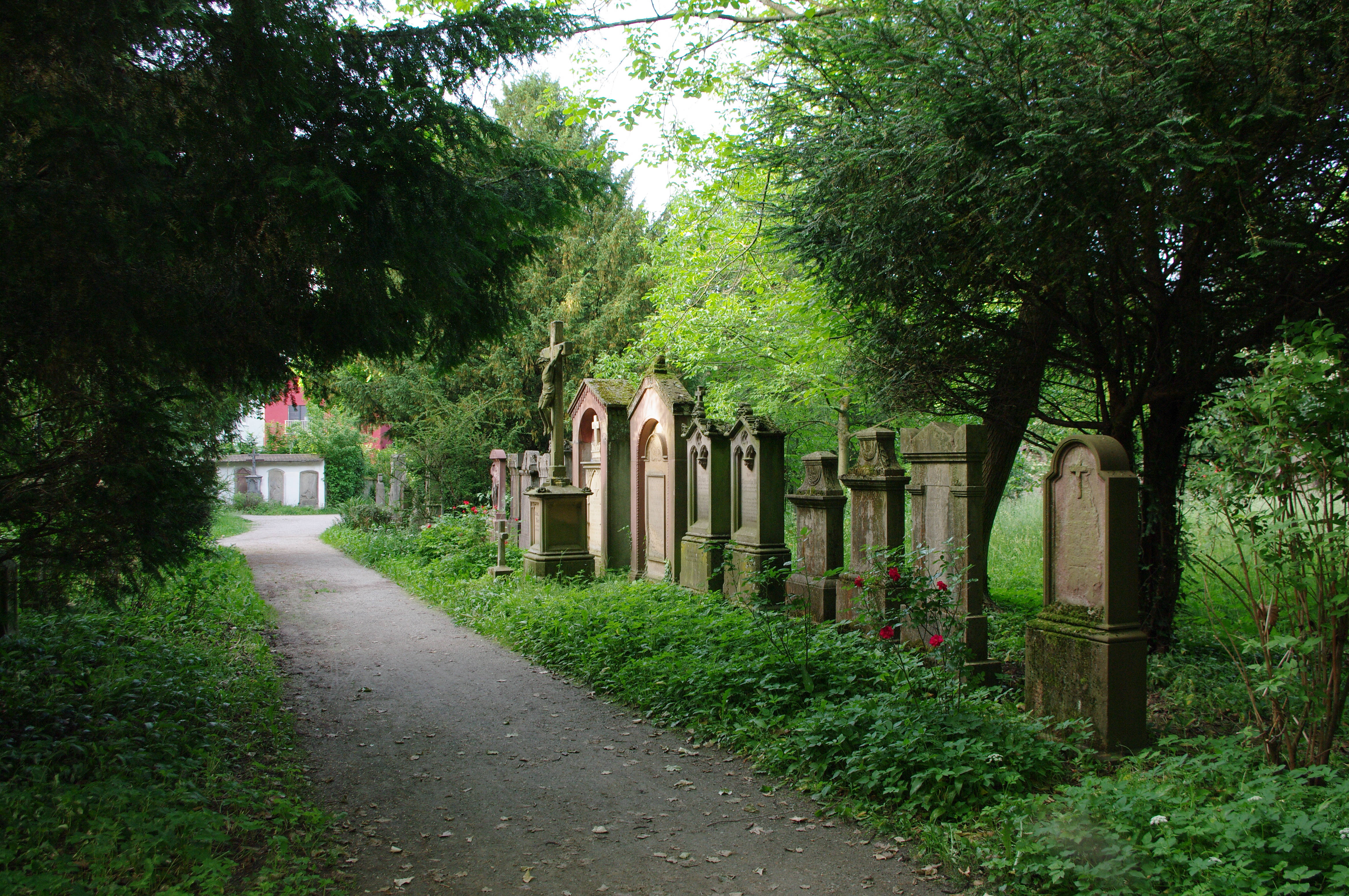
East side of the cemetery

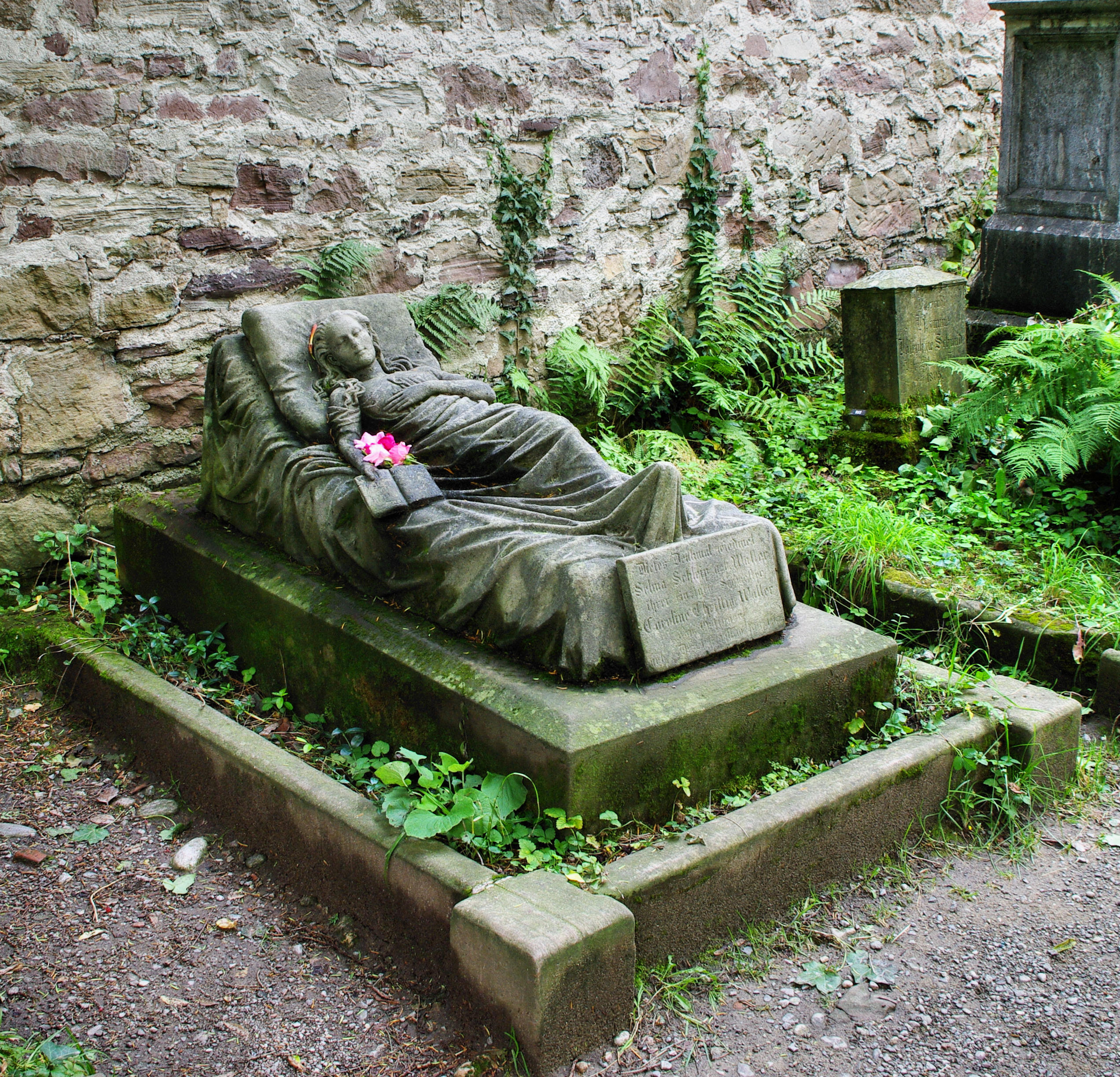
Grave of Caroline Christine Walter

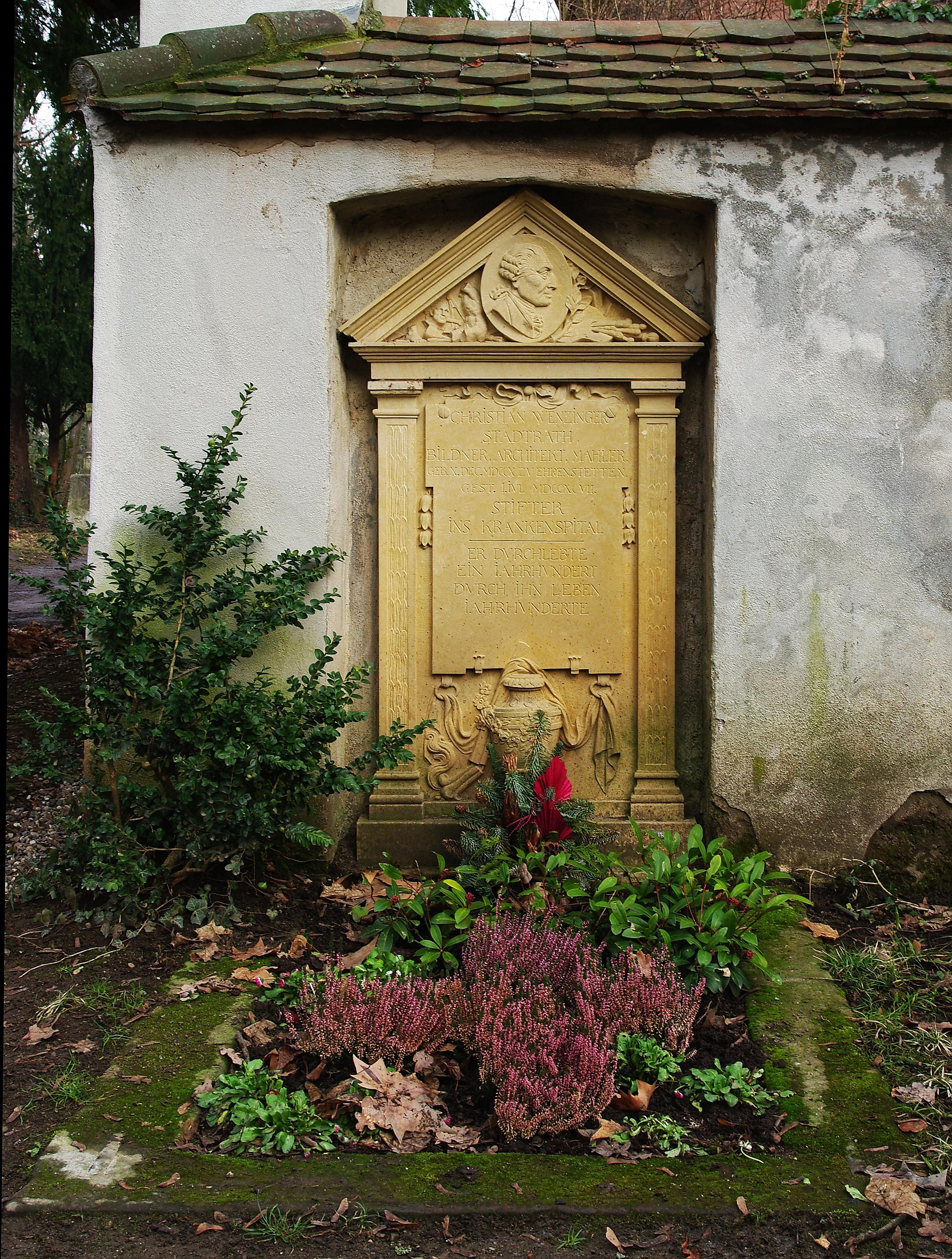
Grave of Christian Wenzinger

The old cemetery (German: Alter Friedhof) in Neuburg, a district of Freiburg im Breisgau, Germany, covers an area of 2.65 hectares. Situated on park-like grounds, the old cemetery is one of Germany's oldest cemeteries that have been abandoned and preserved as a whole. Located close to the Ludwigskirche, it is often mistaken to be part of the neighboring district Herdern. Providing tombs to an estimate of 1200 people, half of them are worthy of preservation. The booster club takes care of maintenance. The old cemetery falls under preservation order of cultural and natural monument. Moreover, it can be seen as evidence for death cult, town history and stylistic area of the 17th and 18th century. Serving not only as a place for individual and artistic tombstones of middle class people. Furthermore, the old cemetery grants an insight into the consciousness of faith during the baroque period until the time of neo-classicism.

== History ==
Built in the year of 1683, its original purpose was to replace the destroyed cemetery close to the former St. Nicholas church in the district Vauban. However, since 1515, the cemetery has served as a replacement for the cemetery around Freiburg Minster. Maximilian I, who was a holy Roman emperor, advised the cemetery around Freiburg Minster to be closed out of fear of an epidemic. Nevertheless, it was possible for people to buy burial places next to Freiburg Minster until 1784. Paying a small contribution, under the name "zum Besten des Münsterbaus", meaning to support the construction, was necessary to obtain a grave. Because of fortifications, the cemetery is located outside of the entrenched city. The cemetery was consecrated in 1683. Until 1872, citizens of Freiburg were buried there. The last burial took place on All Saints Day in 1872. After that, burials have taken place in the current main cemetery and in urban cemeteries. In 1711, the old cemetery was expanded for the first time and fourteen years later the St.-Michael's-Chapel (the cemetery chapel of the old cemetery Freiburg) was consecrated as the chapel of the cemetery. In 1745, the fortress walls were grinded by French troops.

The big cemetery cross is made out of colored sandstone. It was originally placed on the church square of the minster and was transposed to the St.-Michael's-Chapel in January 1786. This cross has a visual particularity: Instead of the "old Adam's" skull, which can be found at the foot of many crosses, there's a skull with an empty eye socket and sparse hair. It has a nail inserted from the left cheekbone to the mouth. There's a toad made out of stone that is looking out of the skull's jaw cavity. The skull's history goes back to an alleged murder which is said to have happened in Freiburg. It tells the story of an old blacksmith who lived near the northward city exit, approximately at the current victory monument. His young wife and the forge journeyman she loved, killed the master smith by hitting a nail in his head. They hid the murder weapon under the hair of the victim. Soon after, they married each other unobstructedly. Due to lack of space, the dead body was disinterred a few years later. A gravedigger found the nail in the skull of which he became aware of through a toad. He reported his finding to the city council resulting in the two murderers being convicted. In 1828 and later in 1859, the cemetery was expanded again. In 1944, the cemetery was damaged heavily because of the bombardments during World War II. So did the Freiburg Danse Macabre, which is located in the front hall of the St.-Michaels-Chapel. On 28 October 1955, it was declared as an extensive natural monument with the protected area number 83110000019. On 26 December 1999, Orcan Lothar logged a plane tree which now grows horizontally. A memorial plaque mentions that and also displays following quote:

"For there is hope of a tree; if it is cut down, it will come to life again, and its branches will not come to an end." (Job 14,7)

In 2016, 40 gravestones were temporarily removed due to lack of stability and they were placed on new bases at the end of the year again. However, some sandstones have to be restored in the workshop before. In early 2019, 35 trees were logged which either stood too close or were damaged.

== Notable graves ==
- André Boniface Louis Riquetti de Mirabeau (1754–1792), French General and brother of Honoré Gabriel de Mirabeau
- Johann Christian Wentzinger (1710–1797), painter and architect
- Johann Georg Jacobi (1740–1814), writer and publicist
- Thaddäus Rinderle (1748–1824), mathematician and professor
