= List of cemeteries in Berlin =

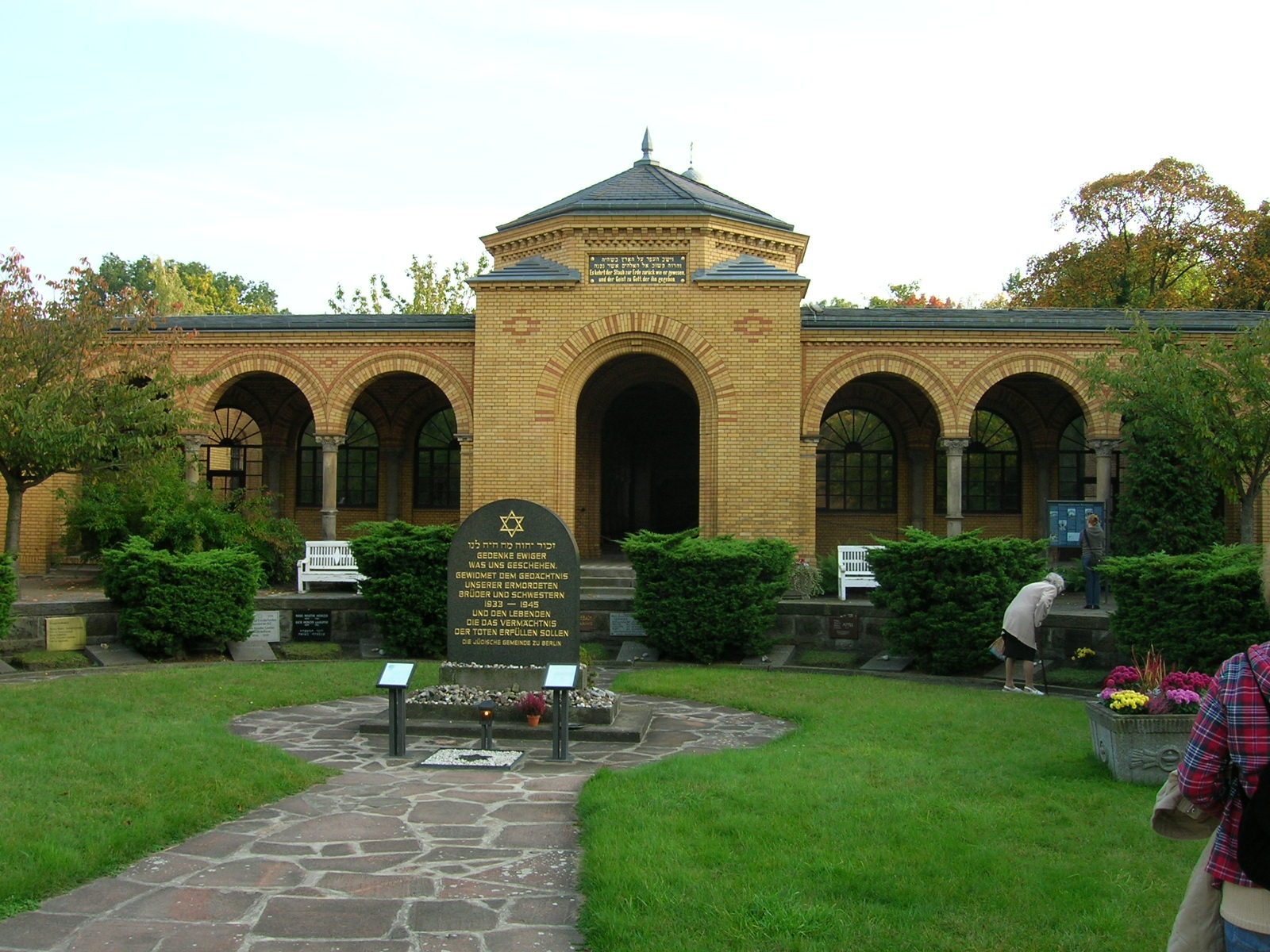
Entrance to Weißensee Cemetery.

This page shows a partial list of cemeteries in Berlin.

== Cemeteries ==
- Charlottenburg, Friedhof Heerstraße, Burial site of Horst Buchholz, George Grosz, Hilde Hildebrand and Grethe Weiser
- Charlottenburg, British War Cemetery, Heerstraße
- Kreuzberg, Holy Trinity Cemetery I Burial site of Fanny Hensel Felix Mendelssohn and Rahel Varnhagen (See: Friedhöfe vor dem Halleschen Tor) also Holy Trinity Cemetery II Burial site of Carl Blechen, Martin Gropius, Adolph von Menzel and Theodor Mommsen. (See Friedhöfe an der Bergmannstraße)
- Kreuzberg, Jerusalem und Neue Kirche III Burial site of Adelbert von Chamisso and E.T.A. Hoffmann (See: Friedhöfe vor dem Halleschen Tor), also Friedhof IV der Gemeinde Jerusalems- und Neue Kirche Burial site of Rikard Nordraak. (See: Friedhof IV der Gemeinde Jerusalems- und Neue Kirche)
- Kreuzberg, Luisenstädtischer Friedhof, Burial site of Gustav Stresemann
- Lichtenberg, Zentralfriedhof Friedrichsfelde. Burial site of Rosa Luxemburg, Karl Liebknecht
- Mitte, Dorotheenstädtischer Friedhof. Burial site of Georg Wilhelm Friedrich Hegel, Johann Gottlieb Fichte, Bertolt Brecht, Karl Friedrich Schinkel, John Heartfield and Johannes Rau
- Niederschönhausen, Friedhof Pankow III, Burial site of Ernst Busch, Fritz Cremer, Hans Litten, Anton Saefkow.
- Schöneberg, Städtischer Friedhof III. Burial site of Marlene Dietrich and Helmut Newton.
- Schöneberg, Alter St.-Matthäus-Kirchhof Berlin. Burial site of the Brothers Grimm and Gustav Kirchhoff. (See de:Alter St.-Matthäus-Kirchhof Berlin)
- Spandau, In den Kisseln. Largest cemetery in Berlin
- Weißensee, Weißensee Cemetery. A large Jewish cemetery which mainly survived Nazism and the DDR.
- Wilmersdorf, Friedhof Schmargendorf. Burial site of Max Pechstein.
- Zehlendorf, Städtischer Friedhof Berlin-Zehlendorf. Burial site of Heinrich George.
- Zehlendorf, St Annen Friedhof, Dahlem Dorf. Burial site of Rudi Dutschke.
- Zehlendorf, Dahlem Cemetery, Burial site of Jacobus Henricus van 't Hoff, the first winner of the Nobel Prize in Chemistry.
- Zehlendorf, Waldfriedhof Dahlem, Hüttenweg. Burial site of Gottfried Benn, La Jana, Karl Hofer, Bernd Rosemeyer and Werner Sombart.
- Zehlendorf, Waldfriedhof Zehlendorf, Potsdamer Chaussee. Burial site of Willy Brandt, Helmut Käutner, Julius Leber, Hildegard Knef, Erich Mühsam, Ernst Reuter and Renée Sintenis.

== See also ==
- de:Kategorie:Friedhof in Berlin
