= Hermanville War Cemetery =

Military cemetery in France

Coordinates: 49.2858°N 0.3090°W

- Commonwealth War Graves Commission
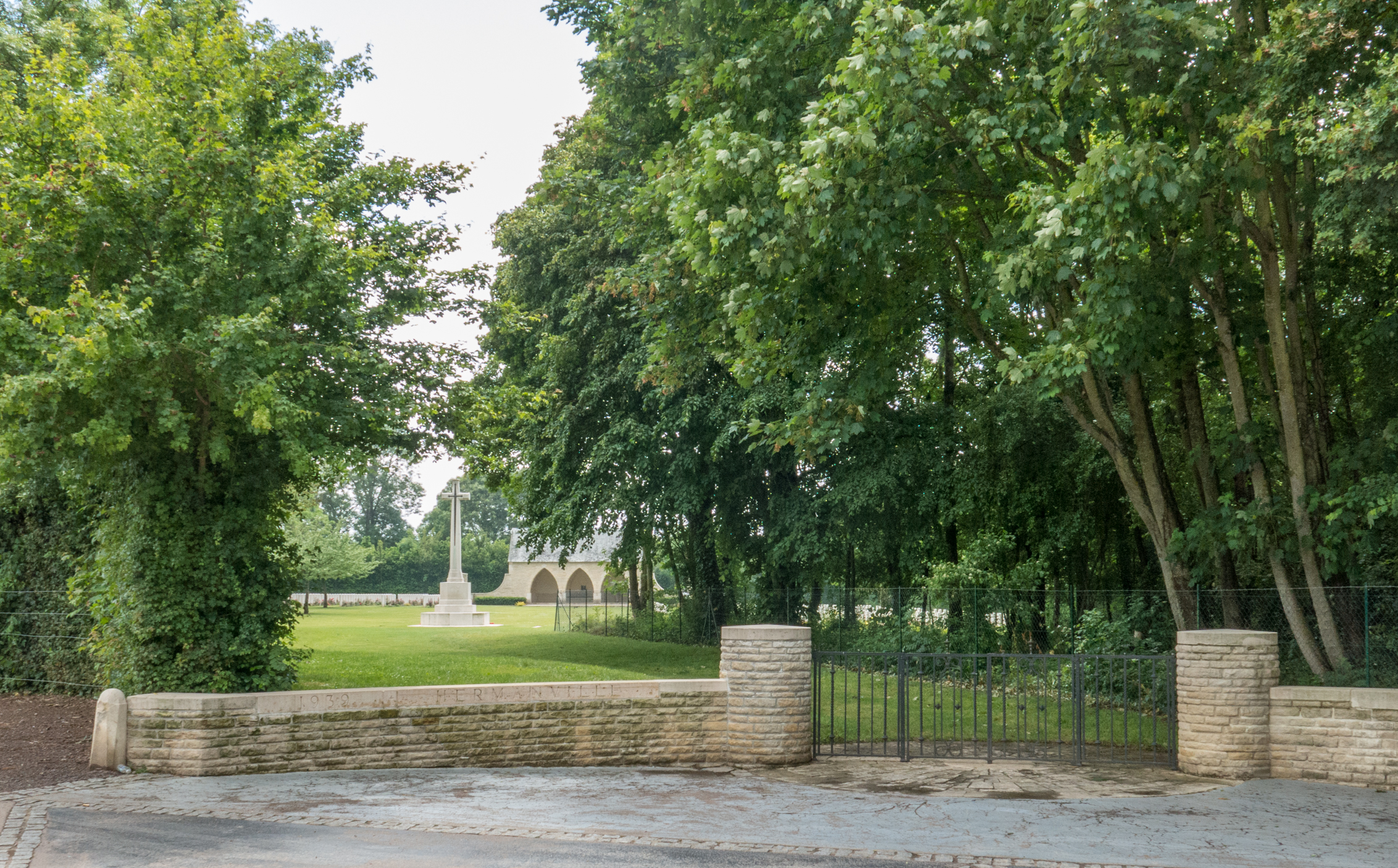
- Hermanville British war cemetery
- Used for those deceased 1944
- Established: 1944
- Location: near Hermanville-sur-Mer, Calvados, France
- Designed by: Philip D. Hepworth
- Total burials: 1,003
- Unknowns: 103

Burials by nation
- United Kingdom: 986 Canada: 13; Australia: 3 France: 3

Burials by war
- World War II

Hermanville War Cemetery is a Second World War cemetery of Commonwealth soldiers in France, located 13 km north of Caen, Normandy. The cemetery contains 1,003 commonwealth war graves.

== History ==
Originally called Sword Beach Cemetery due to its close proximity to Sword Beach, Hermanville British war cemetery was set up shortly after the landings. It contains many soldiers of the 3rd Division who stormed the beach on D-Day, 6 June 1944, and then pushed on towards Caen.

The cemetery also contains a large number of naval and marine commando casualties, as well as graves moved to the cemetery from Operation Goodwood in July and from the fighting to close the Falaise Gap in August 1944.

== Location ==
The cemetery is in the commune of Hermanville-sur-Mer on Rue du Cimetière Anglais (off the D.60).

== See also ==
- American Battle Monuments Commission
- UK National Inventory of War Memorials
- German War Graves Commission
- List of military cemeteries in Normandy
