= List of military cemeteries in Normandy =

The following military cemeteries were established in the French region of Normandy in memory for casualties of the World War II battles there:

== American ==
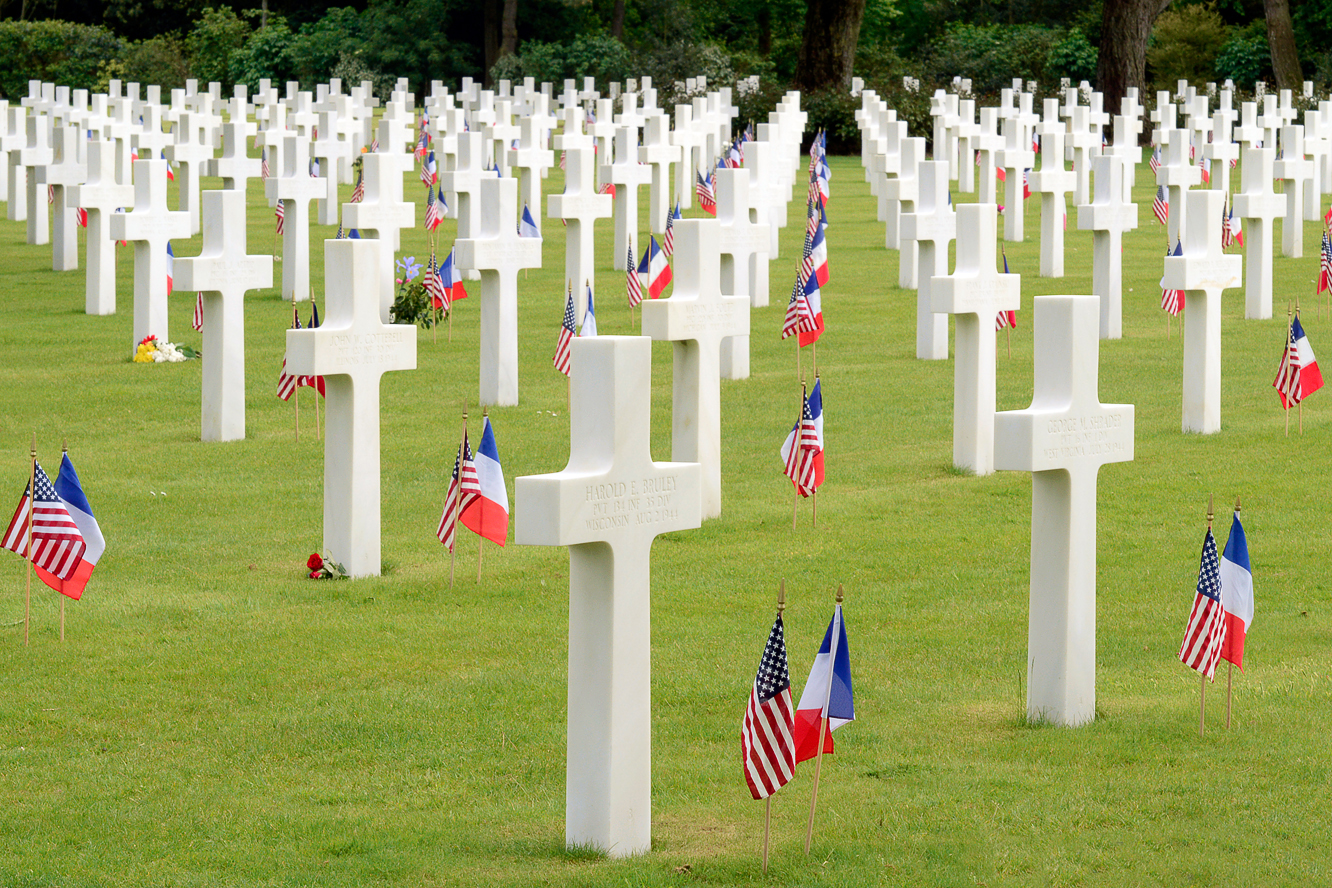
Crosses at the Normandy American Cemetery after an Anniversary commemoration

- The Normandy American Cemetery and Memorial, located near the battle site at Omaha Beach.
- The Brittany American Cemetery and Memorial, located near Saint-James. Despite the name of the cemetery, it is located in Normandy, on the border with Brittany.

== British ==
- Banneville-la-Campagne War Cemetery contains 2,175 Commonwealth burials of the Second World War with a high number of casualties from Operation Goodwood interred in the cemetery.
- Bayeux War Cemetery contains 4,144 Commonwealth burials of the Second World War, 338 of them unidentified. There are also over 500 war graves of other nationalities, the majority German.
- Brouay War Cemetery contains 375 British and 2 Canadian graves with a high number of casualties from the 53rd (Welsh) Division.
- Cambes-en-Plaine War Cemetery contains 223 graves of those that fell during the fighting around Caen with a high number from the British 59th Division.
- Fontenay-le-Pesnel War Cemetery contains 457 British, four Canadian and 59 German casualties of fighting in the local area.
- Hermanville War Cemetery contains 986 British, 13 Canadian, three Australian and three French graves predominantly of those that fell during the landing on Sword.
- Hottot-les-Bagues War Cemetery contains 1015 Commonwealth graves (56 unidentified).
- Jerusalem War Cemetery is the smallest in Normandy containing 47 British, one Czech and one unidentified grave.
- La Délivrande War Cemetery contains 942 Allied soldiers' graves and 180 German graves.
- Ranville War Cemetery contains 2,235 Commonwealth burials of the Second World War, 97 of them unidentified. There are also 330 German graves and a few burials of other nationalities. The neighbouring churchyard also contains 47 Commonwealth burials, one of which is unidentified, and one German grave.
- Ryes War Cemetery contains 652 Commonwealth burials and one Polish burial - mainly from casualties landing on Gold Beach. There are also 335 German graves. This cemetery is actually closer to Bazenville than Ryes.
- Saint-Charles-de-Percy War Cemetery is the southernmost cemetery in Normandy and contains 703 burials.
- Saint-Désir-de-Lisieux German war cemetery contains 594 burials and is adjacent to the German cemetery of the same name.
- Saint-Manvieu War Cemetery contains 1,627 Commonwealth burials, 49 of them unidentified. There are also 555 German burials.
- Secqueville-en-Bessin War Cemetery contains 114 fallen soldiers, the majority from the advance on Caen in July 1944.
- Tilly-sur-Seulles War Cemetery contains the graves of 990 Allied and 232 German soldiers.
- Tourgeville War Cemetery is primarily a First World War Commonwealth cemetery, which also contains 42 Second World War graves, of which 34 Germans, 6 British and 2 Canadian.

== Canadian ==
- Bény-sur-Mer Canadian War Cemetery
- Bretteville-sur-Laize Canadian War Cemetery

== French ==
- Les Gateys National Cemetery contains 19 graves of soldiers belonging to the French 2nd Armoured Division.

== German ==
- La Cambe German war cemetery, the largest military cemetery in Normandy with more than 21,000 German soldiers' graves, near the village of La Cambe
- Champigny-Saint-André German war cemetery near Saint-André-de-l'Eure
- Marigny German war cemetery near La Chapelle-en-Juger contains over 11,000 graves, the majority killed during Operation Cobra, the American advance in the summer of 1944
- Mont-de-Huisnes German war cemetery near Huisnes-sur-Mer is the only German crypt construction in France and contains nearly 12,000 burials of German military personnel plus some women and children
- Orglandes German war cemetery contains over 10,000 burials mainly of soldiers killed on the Cotentin peninsular
- Saint-Désir-de-Lisieux German war cemetery near Saint-Désir has 3,735 German burials in the main killed during the last days of the Battle of Normandy and inside the Falaise Pocket in August 1944

German graves may also be found within these Commonwealth War Graves Commission cemeteries: Bayeux, Fontenay-le-Pesnel, La Délivrande, Ryes, Saint-Manvieu, Tilly-sur-Seulles, and Tourgeville War Cemetery.

== Polish ==
- Grainville-Langannerie Polish war cemetery is the only Polish war cemetery in France and contains the graves of 650 Polish soldiers killed during the Battle of Normandy.

== Russian ==
- Saint-Germain-du-Corbéis Cemetery has four Soviet PoWs who escaped from a labour camp and joined the French resistance. They were executed by the Gestapo on 12 May 1944 in Aulnays.
