= La Délivrande War Cemetery =

Military cemetery in France

La Délivrande war cemetery
- Commonwealth War Graves Commission
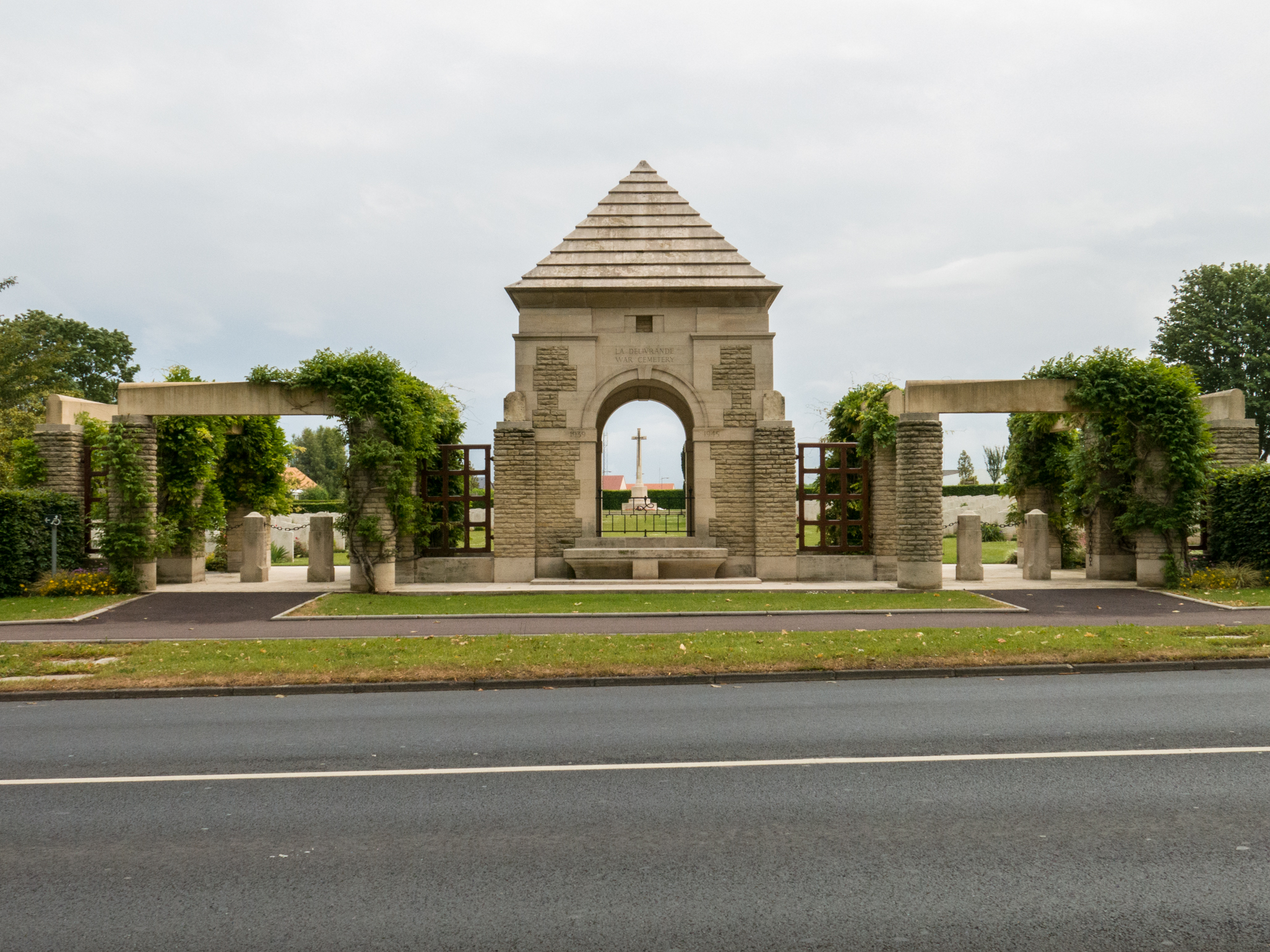
- La Délivrande war cemetery
- Used for those deceased 1944
- Established: 1944
- Location: 49.2902°N 0.3771°W near Douvres-la-Délivrande, Calvados, France
- Designed by: Philip D. Hepworth
- Total burials: 1,123
- Unknowns: 1

Burials by nation
- United Kingdom: 927 Canada: 11; Australia: 3 Poland: 1 Germany: 180

Burials by war
- World War II

La Délivrande war cemetery is a Second World War cemetery of Commonwealth soldiers in France, located 14 km (8.7 mi) north of Caen, Normandy. The cemetery contains 943 commonwealth war graves and 180 German war graves.

== History ==
The majority of the soldiers interred in the cemetery were killed on D-Day, 6 June 1944 and the following weeks as the Allies advanced south towards Caen. There are a number of burials of soldiers killed on Sword Beach – especially from the sectors Oboe and Peter.

The cemetery has a number of double headstones marked with "BURIED NEAR THIS SPOT".

== Photographs ==
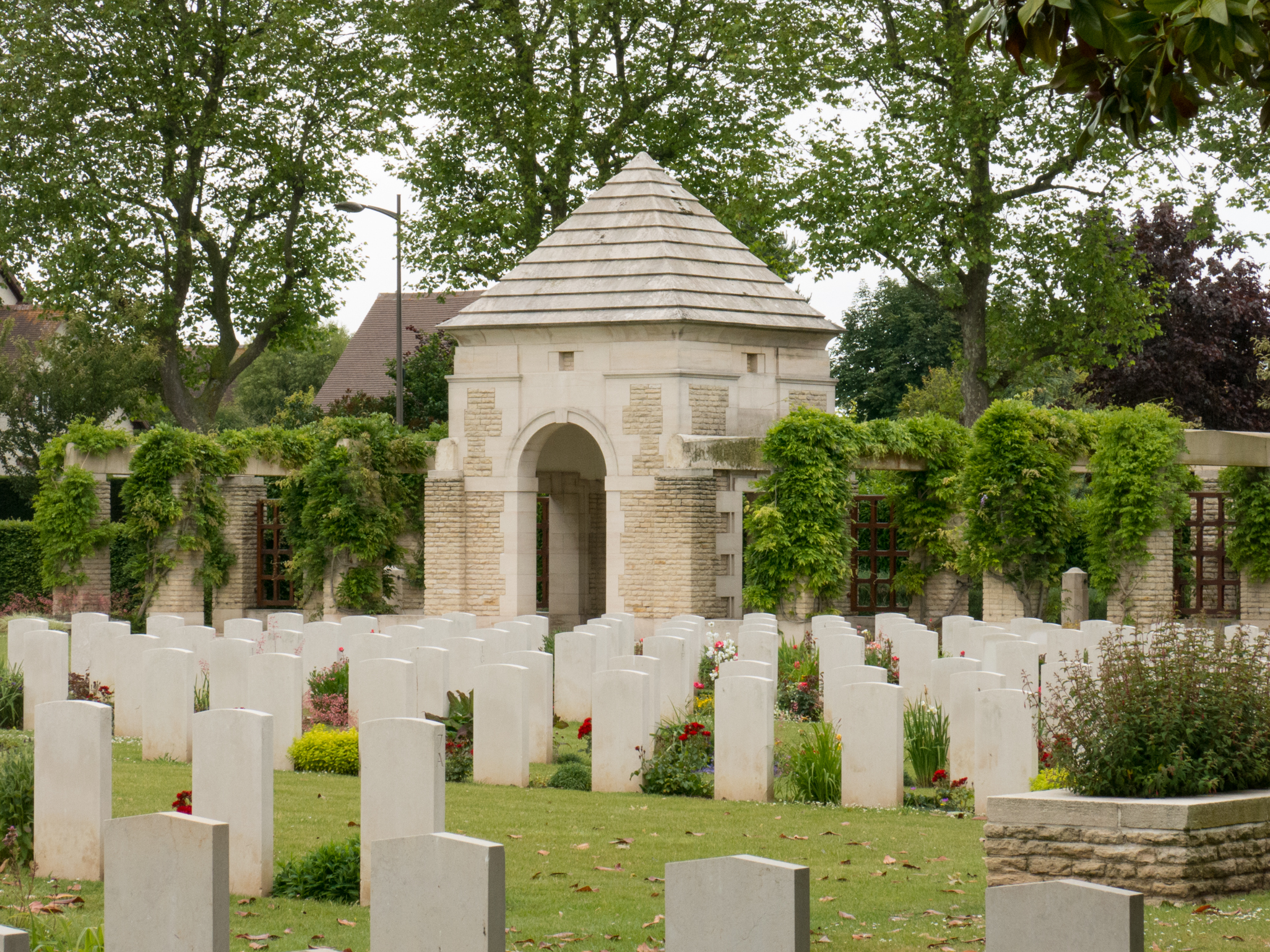
Entrance to the war cemetery

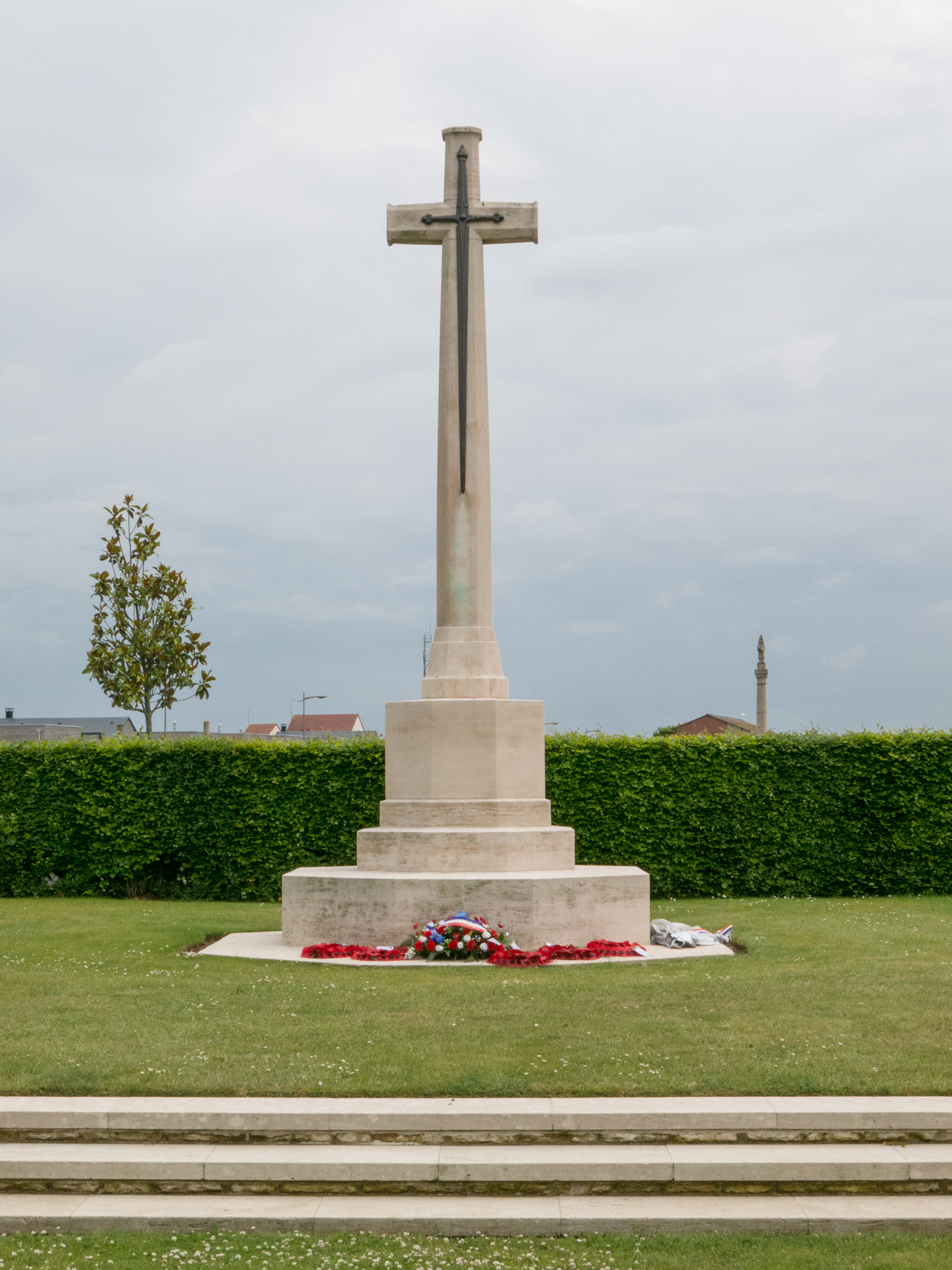
Sacrificial cross in the cemetery

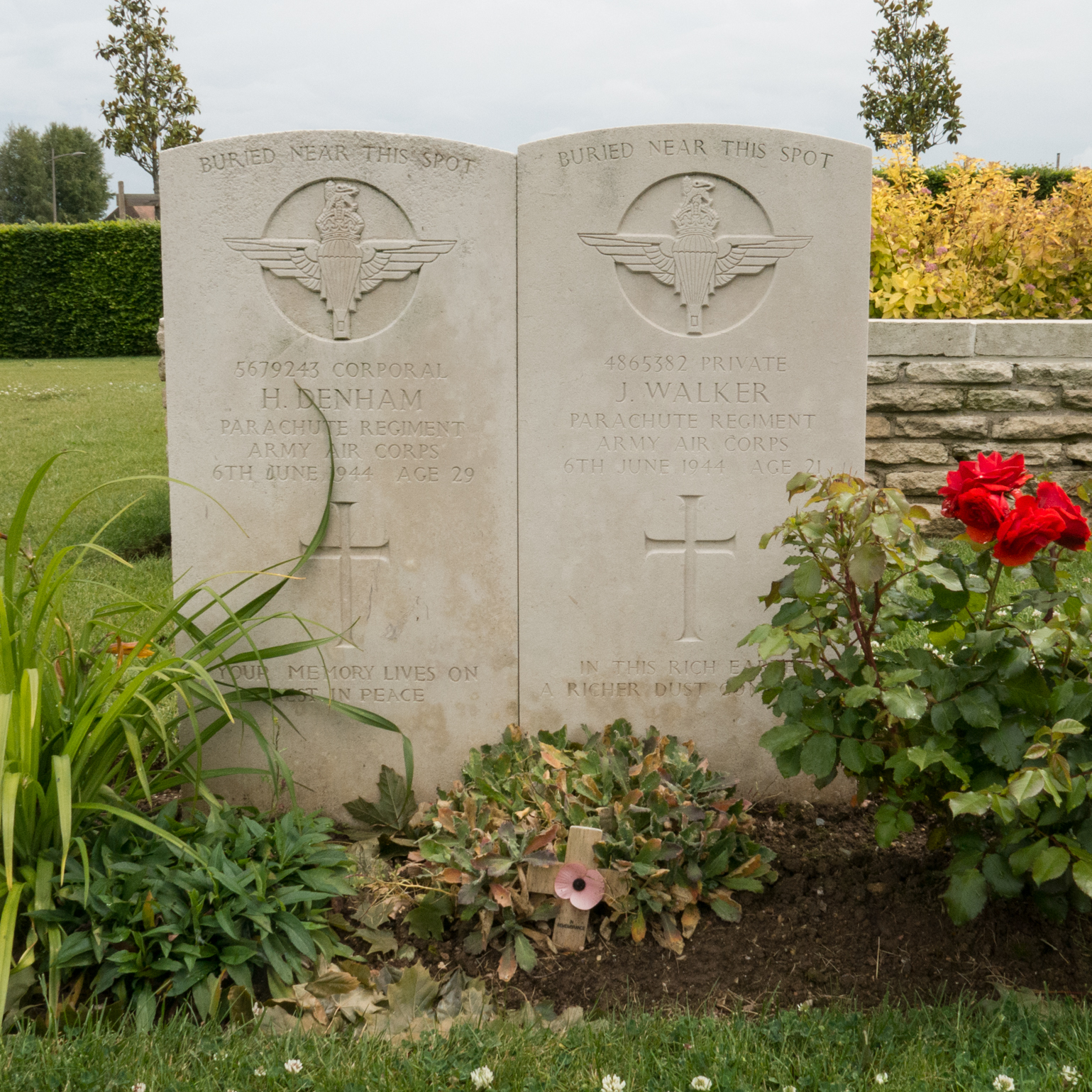
Double headstone

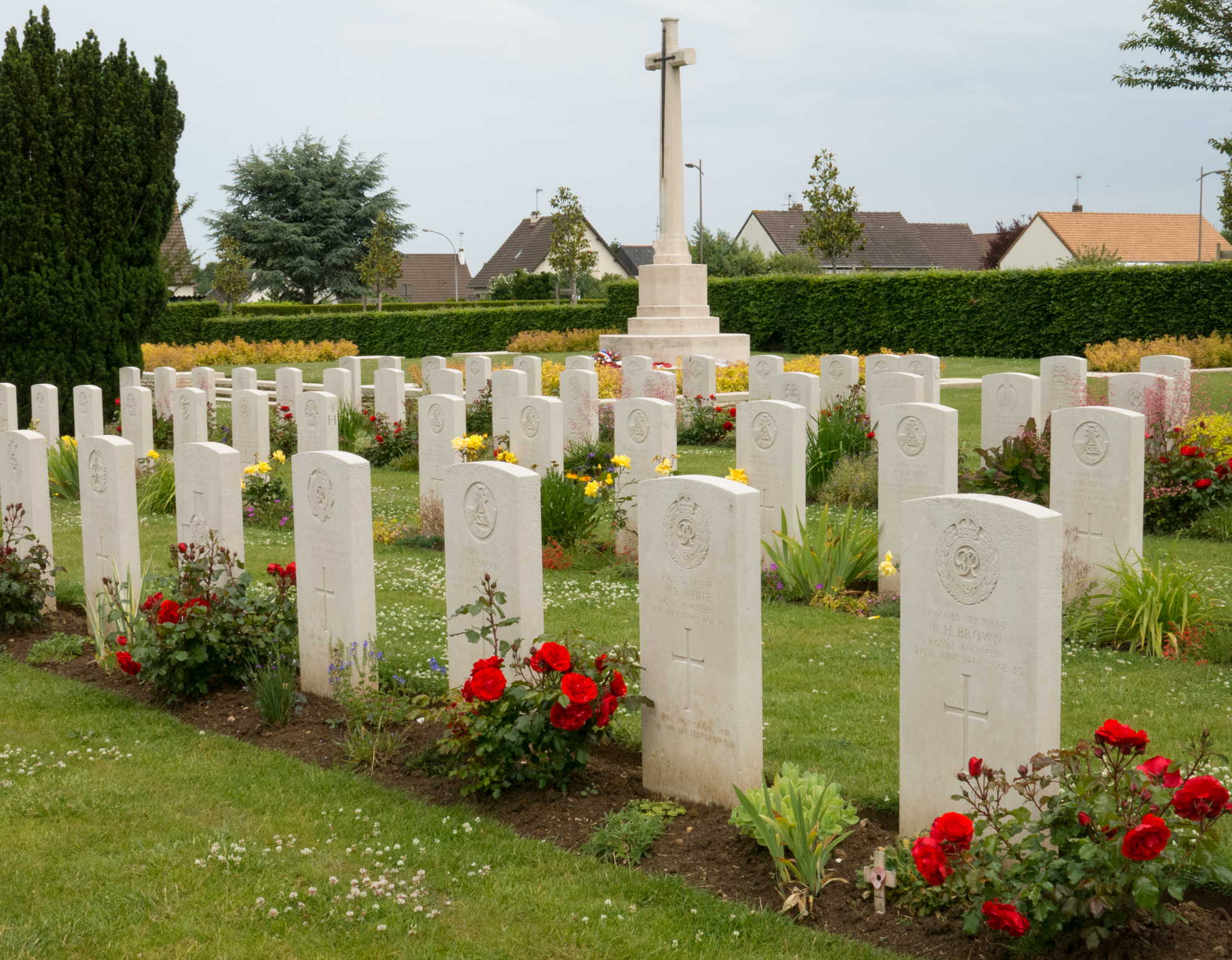
Graves and cross

== Location ==
The cemetery is 14 km north of Caen on the D.7.

== See also ==
- American Battle Monuments Commission
- UK National Inventory of War Memorials
- German War Graves Commission
- List of military cemeteries in Normandy
