= Cambes-en-Plaine War Cemetery =

Military cemetery in Normandy

- Commonwealth War Graves Commission
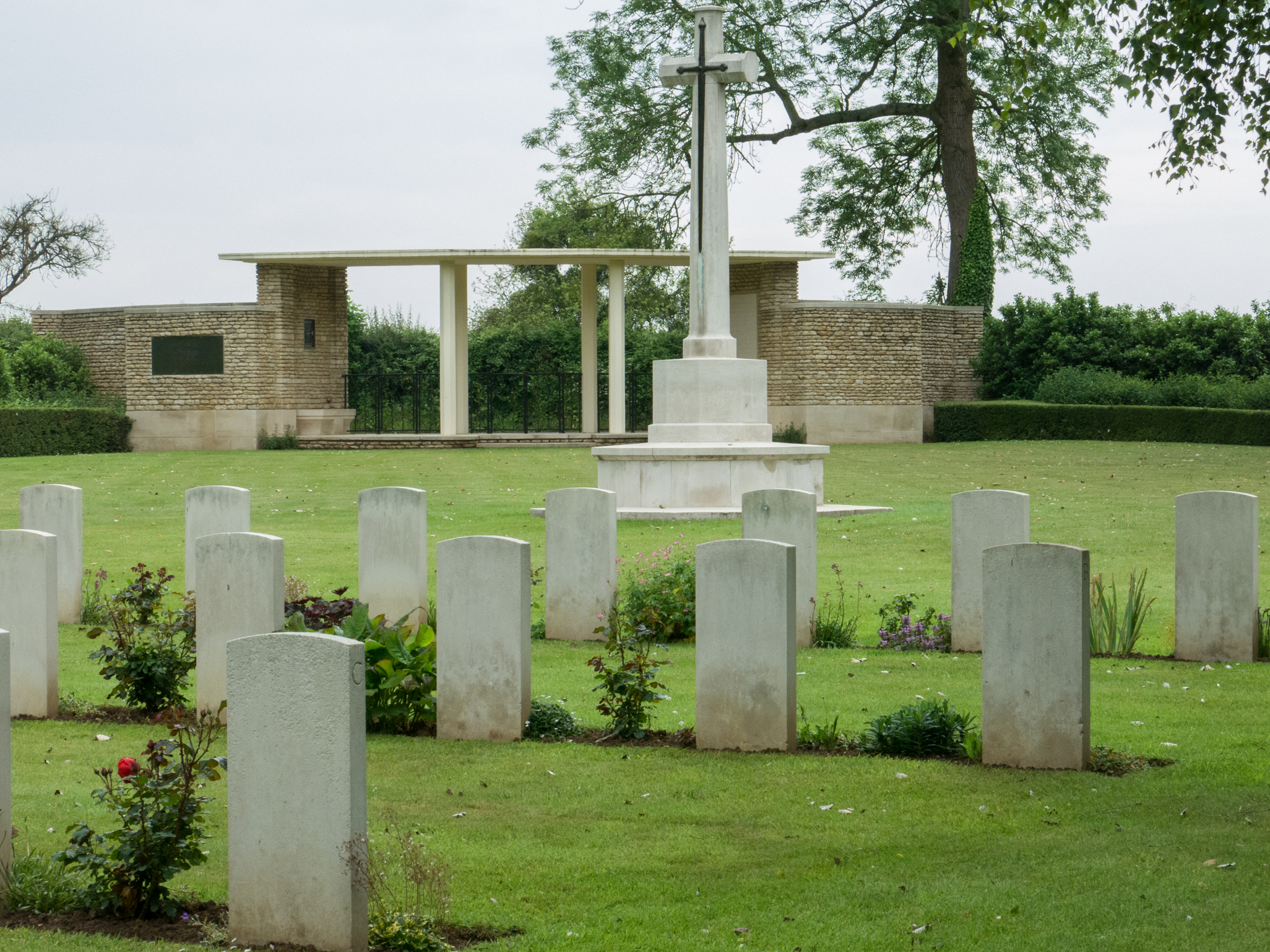
- For Operation Overlord
- Established: 1944
- Location: 49.2362°N 0.3855°W near Cambes-en-Plaine, Calvados, France
- Designed by: Philip D. Hepworth
- Total burials: 224
- Unknowns: 1

Burials by nation
- United Kingdom: 224

Burials by war
- World War II

Cambes-en-Plaine War Cemetery is a Second World War cemetery of Commonwealth soldiers in France, located seven km northwest of Caen, Normandy. The cemetery contains 224 graves of which one is unidentified.

== History ==
Following the Allied landings on D-Day, elements of the East Riding Yeomanry, supporting the British 3rd Infantry Division pushed through to the northern outskirts of Cambes-en-Plaine on 9 June 1944. A defensive German line here stopped the advance on Caen. A large number of burials date to between the 8 and 12 July 1944, during Operation Charnwood, the final attack on Caen. Over half of the burials in the graveyard are from soldiers in the 59th (Staffordshire) Infantry Division.

== Location ==
The cemetery is located in the commune of Cambes-en-Plaine, in the Calvados department of Normandy, on the Rue du Mesnil Ricard (D.79B).

== Photographs ==
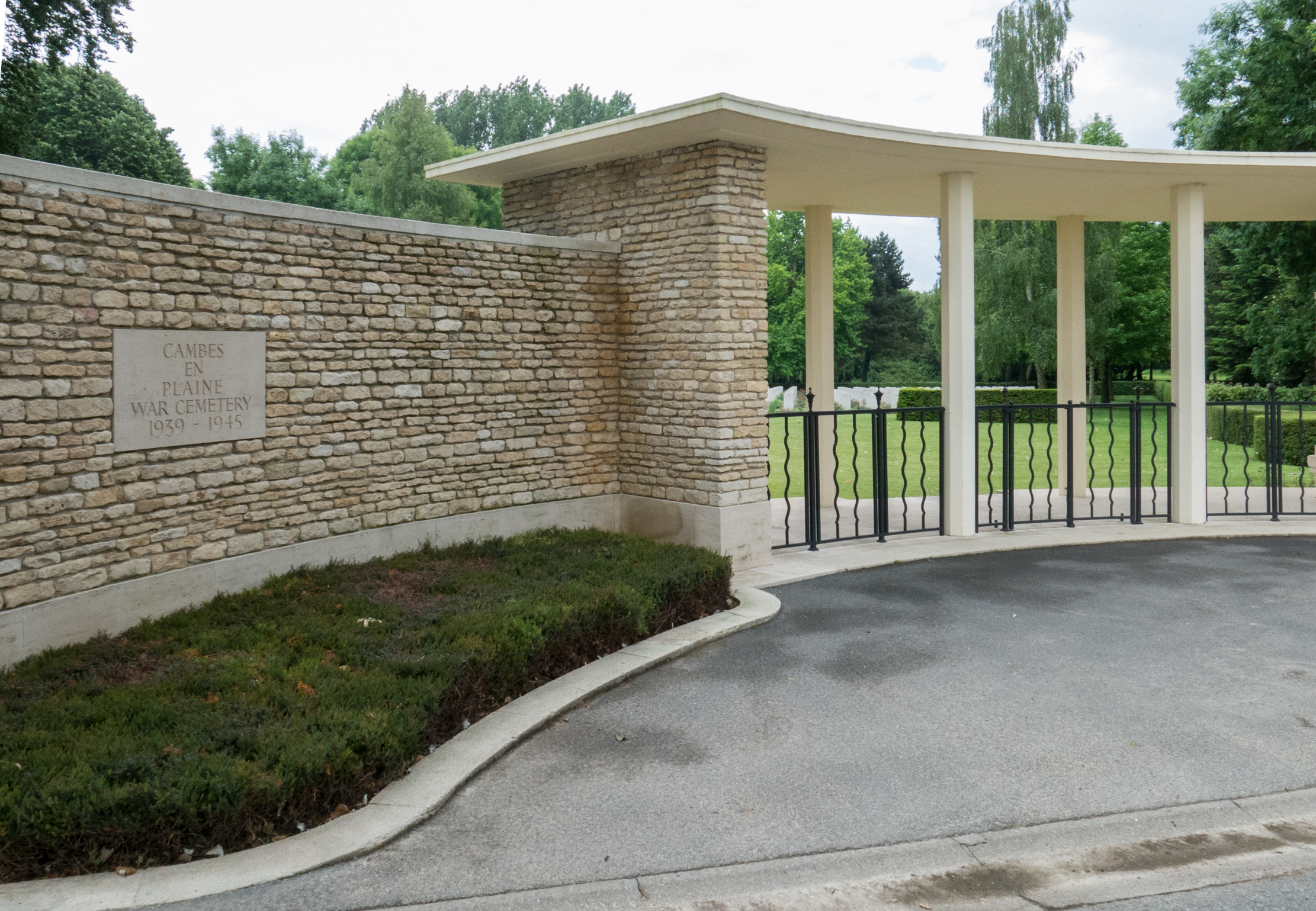
Entrance to the war cemetery

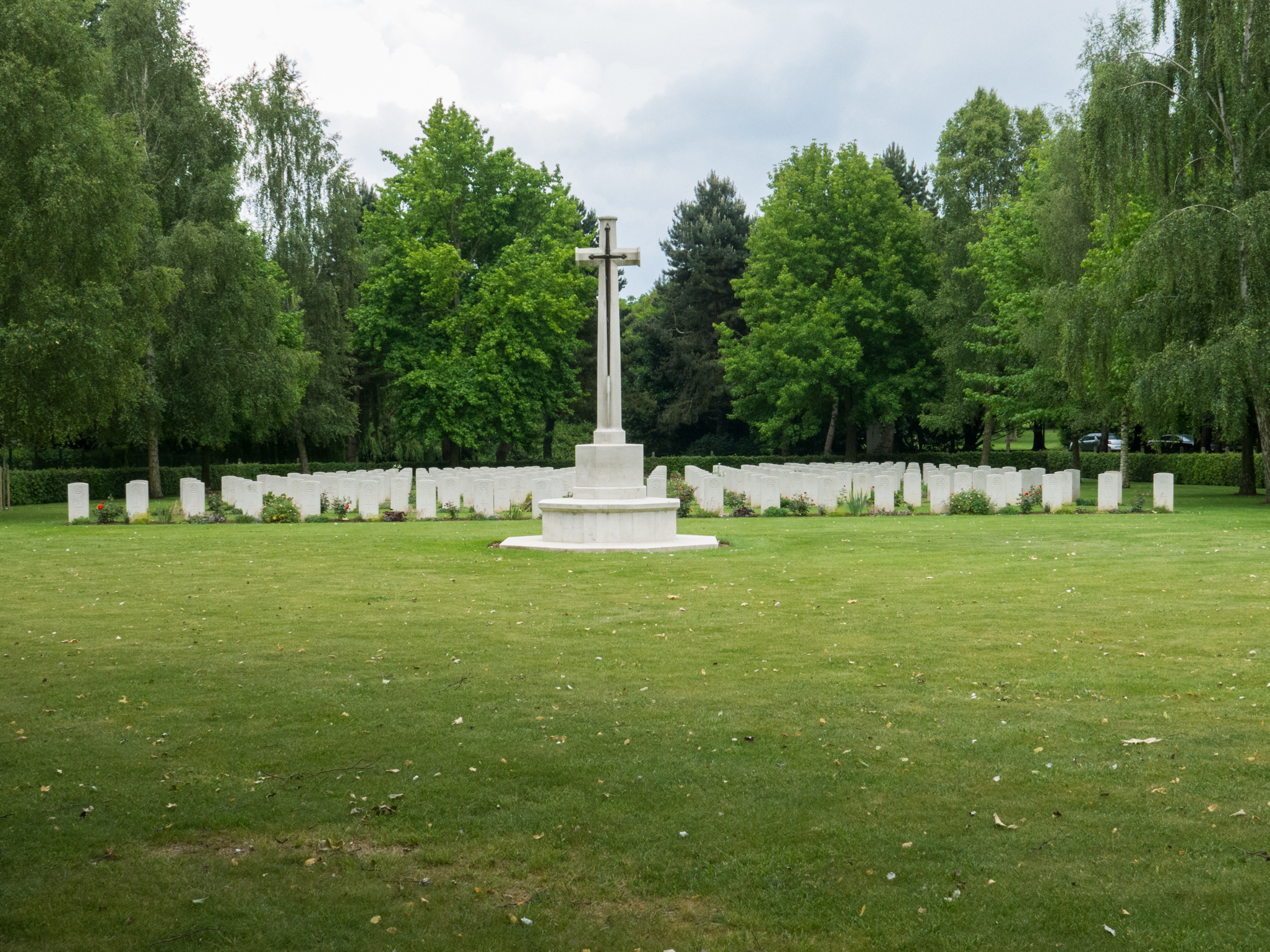
Sacrificial cross in the cemetery

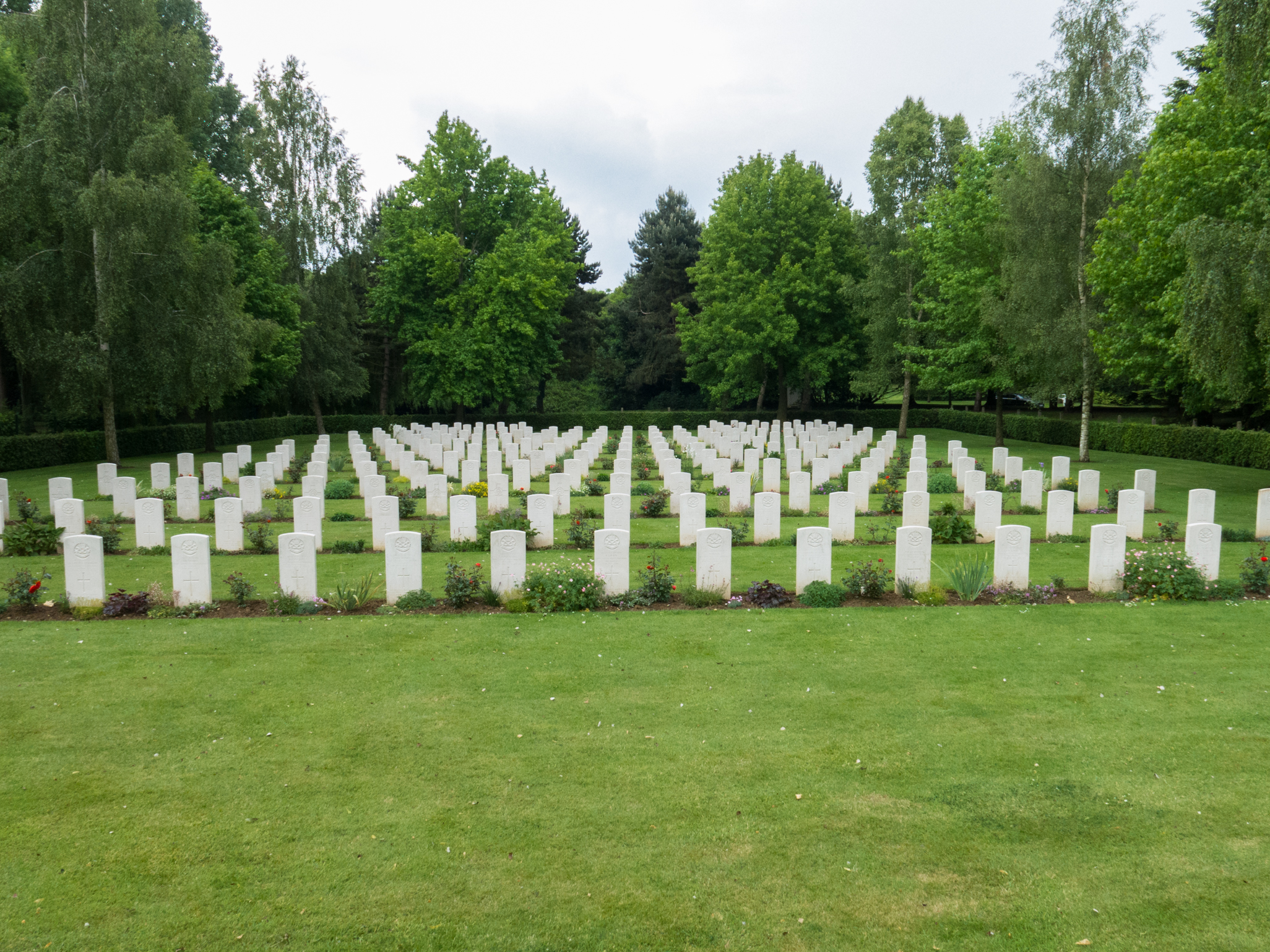
Brouay war cemetery

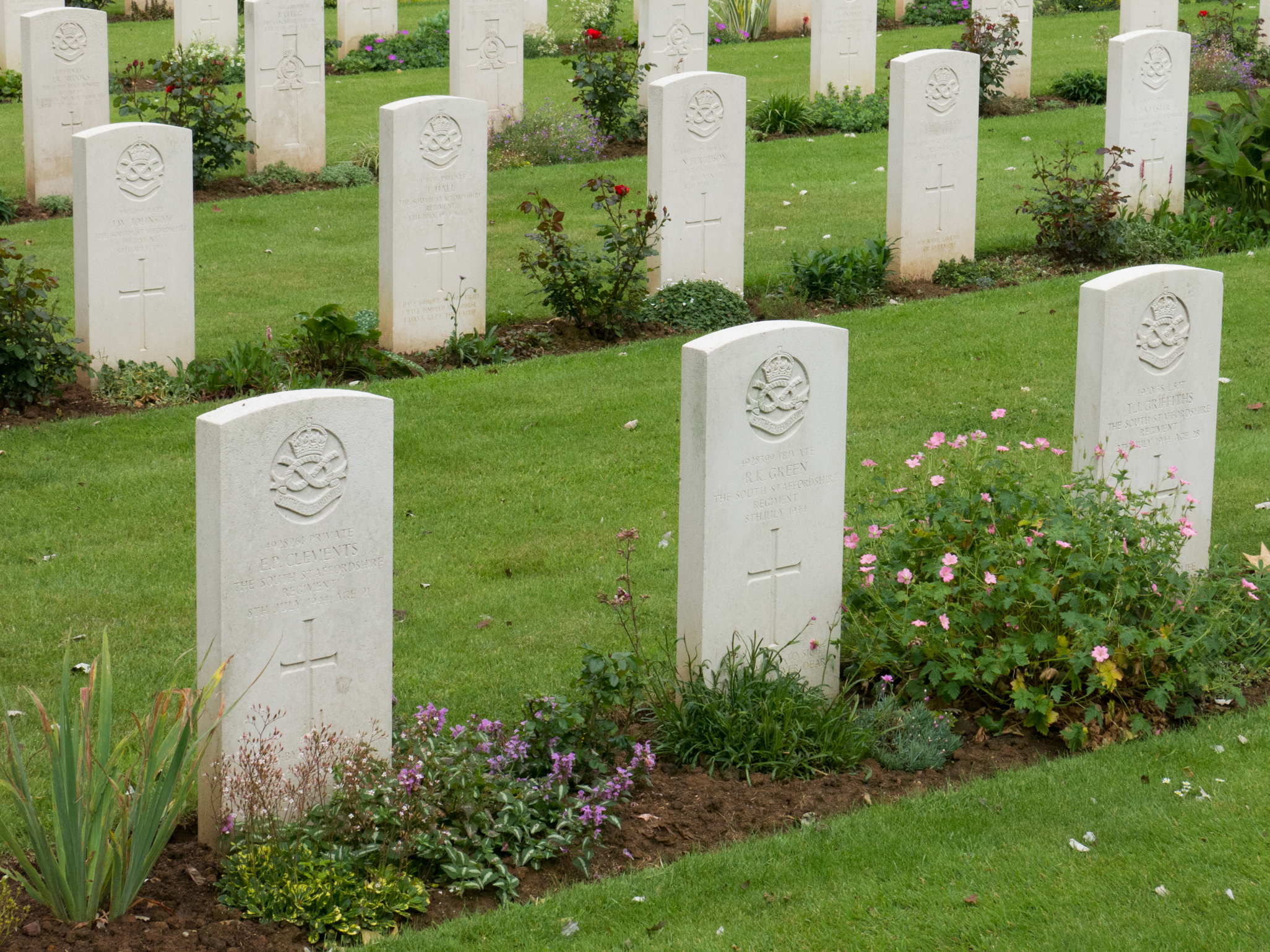
Graves of 59th (Staffordshire) Division soldiers

== See also ==
- American Battle Monuments Commission
- UK National Inventory of War Memorials
- German War Graves Commission
- List of military cemeteries in Normandy
