= Jerusalem War Cemetery, Chouain =

WWII CWGC cemetery in Normandy, France

- Commonwealth War Graves Commission
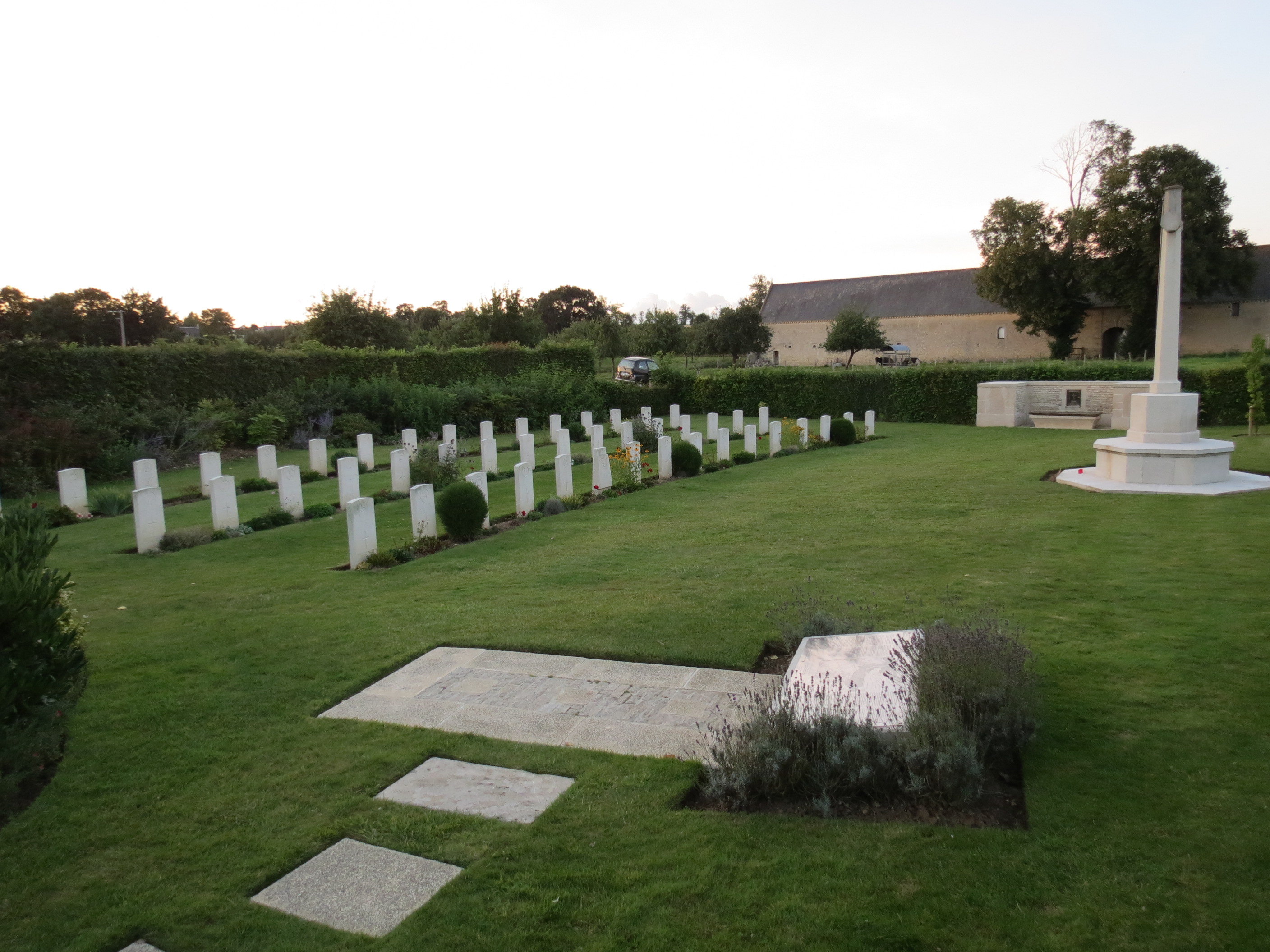
- Jerusalem War Cemetery
- Used for those deceased 1944
- Established: 1944
- Location: 49.2101°N 0.6519°W near Chouain, Calvados, France
- Designed by: Philip D. Hepworth
- Total burials: 48
- Commemorated: one unknown

Burials by nation
- United Kingdom: 46 known, 1 unknown Czech: 1

Burials by war
- World War II

Jerusalem War Cemetery is one of the smallest Second World War cemetery of Commonwealth soldiers in Normandy, France. It is located between Bayeux and Tilly-sur-Seulles, close to the commune of Chouain. The cemetery contains 46 known Commonwealth war graves, 1 Czech grave, and 1 unknown British grave.

== History ==
The majority of the soldiers interred in the cemetery were killed in June and July 1944 as the Allies pushed south of Bayeux and then south-west to encircle Caen. Many casualties were involved in fighting around Tilly-sur-Seulles.

The graveyard has two chaplains interred in it; Reverend Cecil James Hawksworth and Reverend Gerard Nesbit and the grave of the youngest British soldier killed in Normandy, 16-year-old Private Jack Banks of the Durham Light Infantry.

This cemetery was the first Commonwealth War Graves Commission cemetery in France to have a Cross of Sacrifice erected.

== Location ==
The cemetery is on the D.6, 9 kilometres south-east of Bayeux, close to the commune of Choain.

== Gallery ==
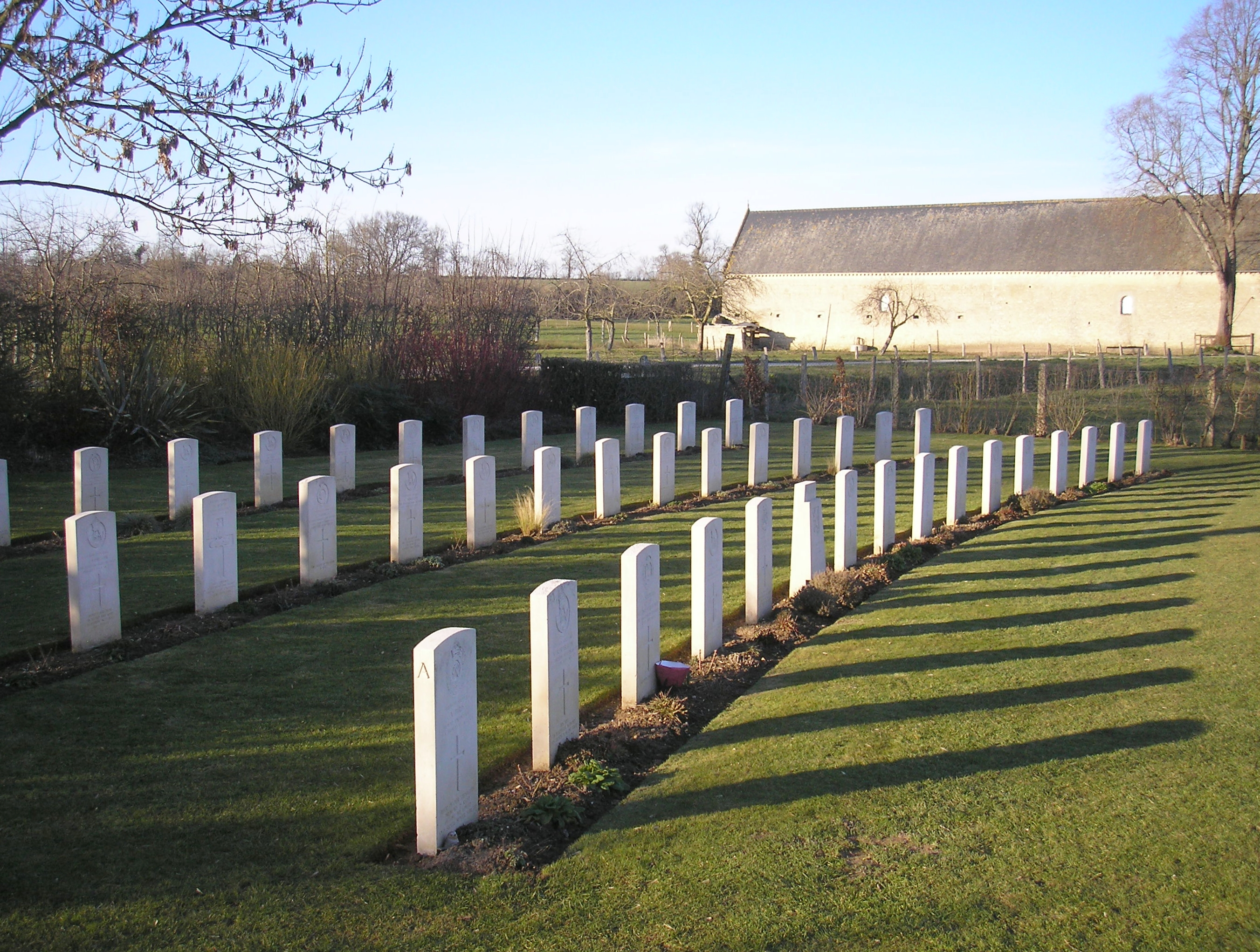
Gravestones in Jerusalem cemetery

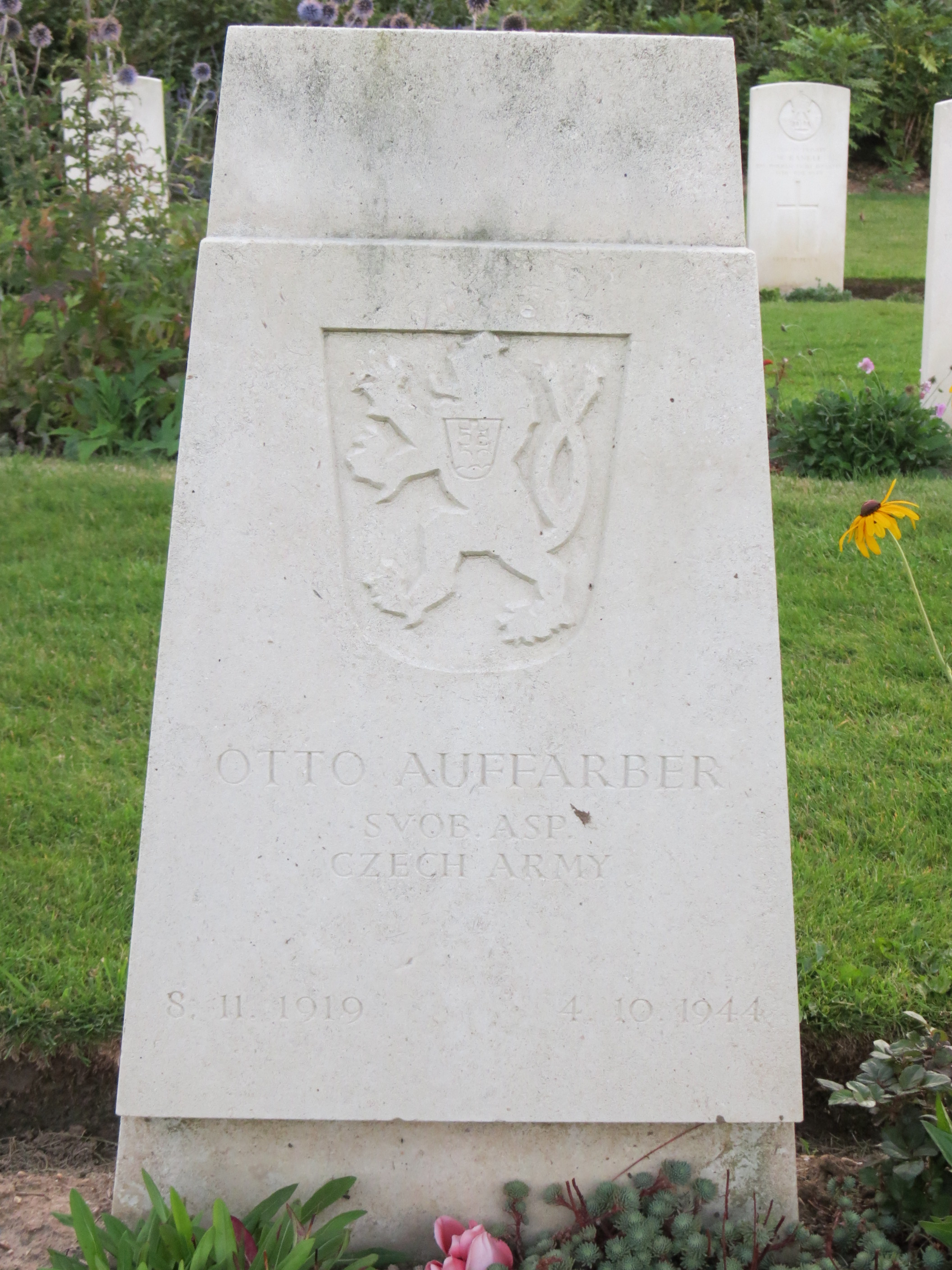
Grave of Czech soldier

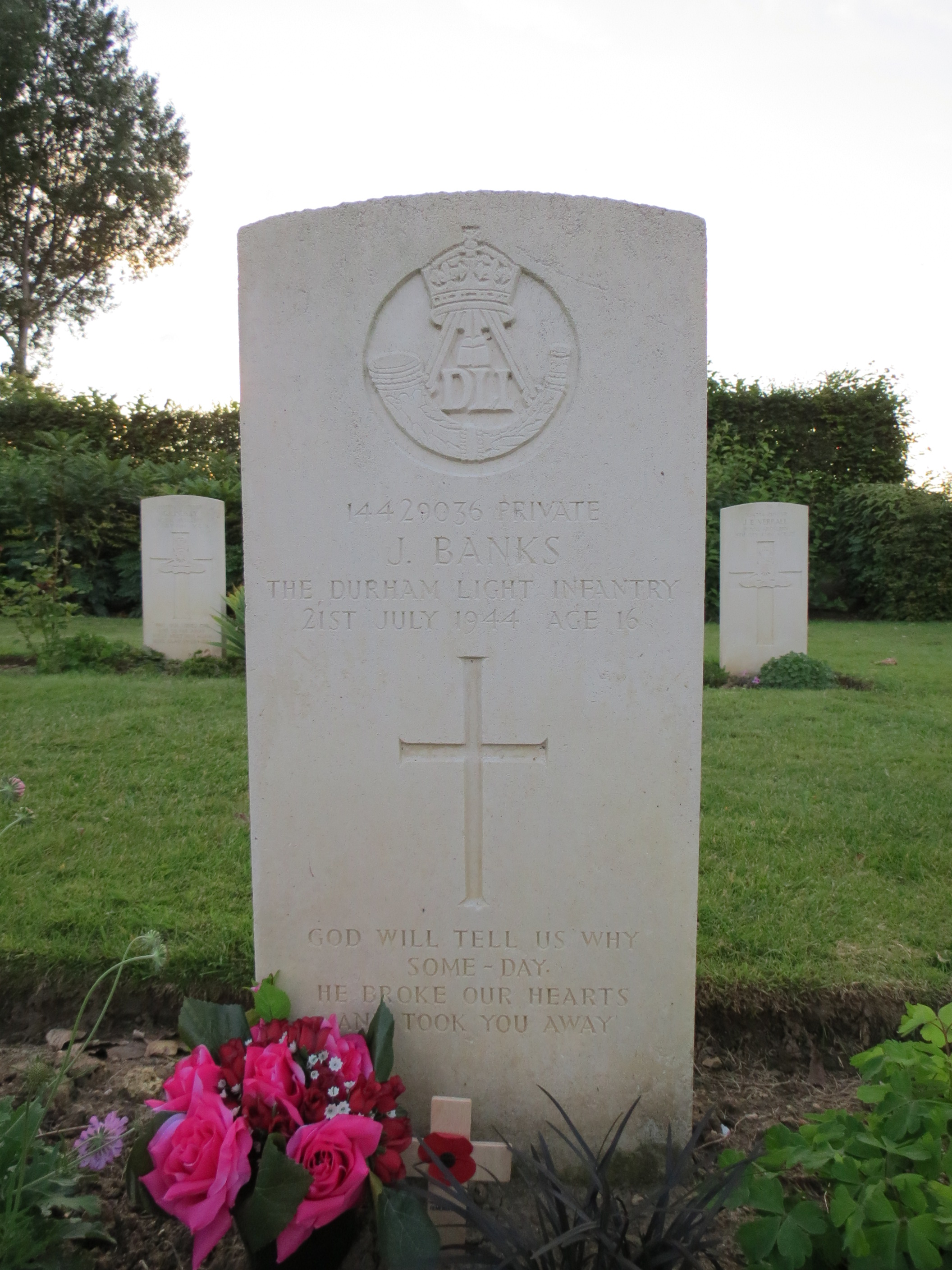
Grave of 16-year-old Private Banks

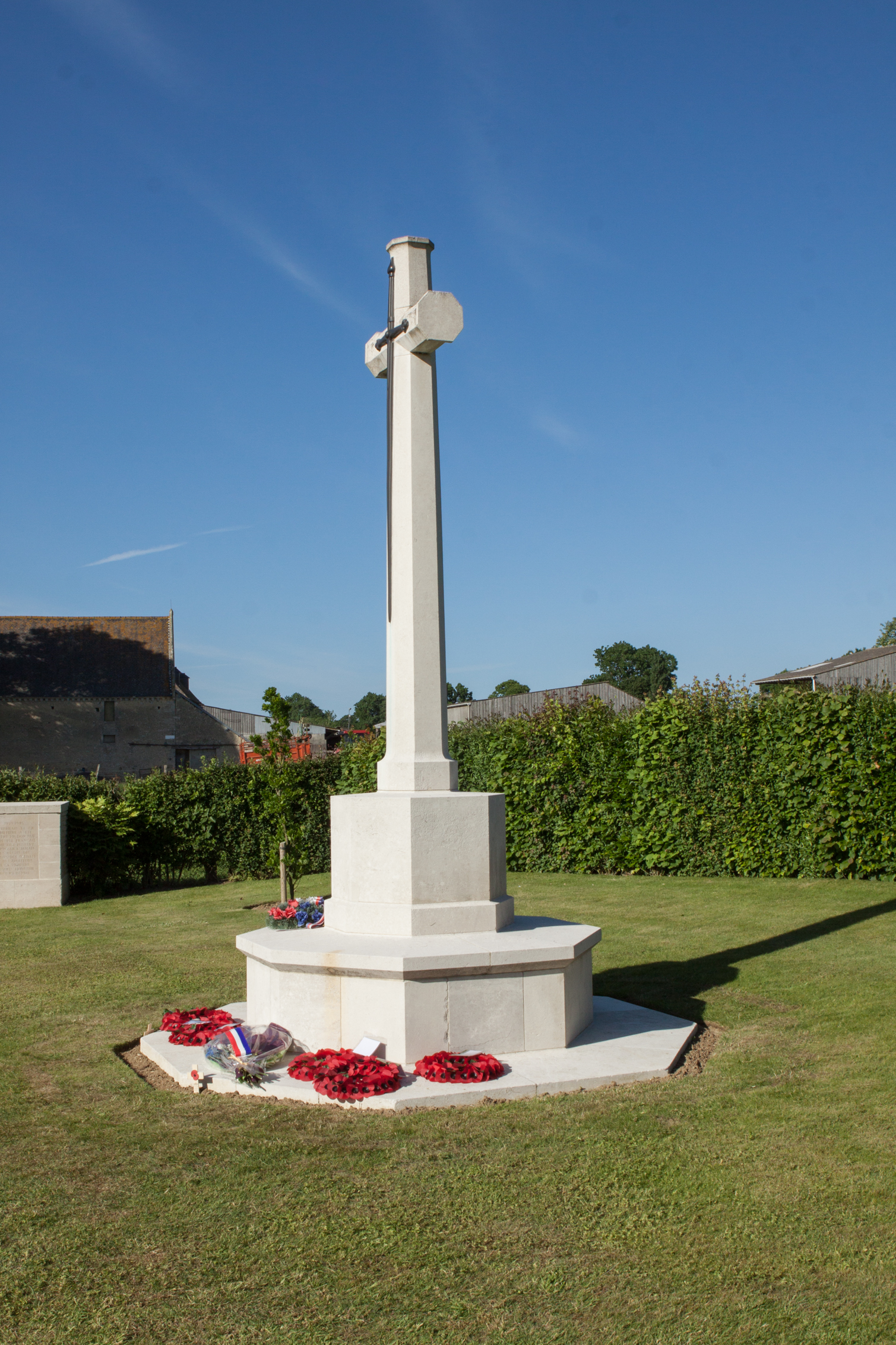
Cross of Sacrifice

== See also ==
- American Battle Monuments Commission
- UK National Inventory of War Memorials
- German War Graves Commission
- List of military cemeteries in Normandy
