= Fontenay-le-Pesnel War Cemetery =

Military cemetery in Normandy

- Commonwealth War Graves Commission
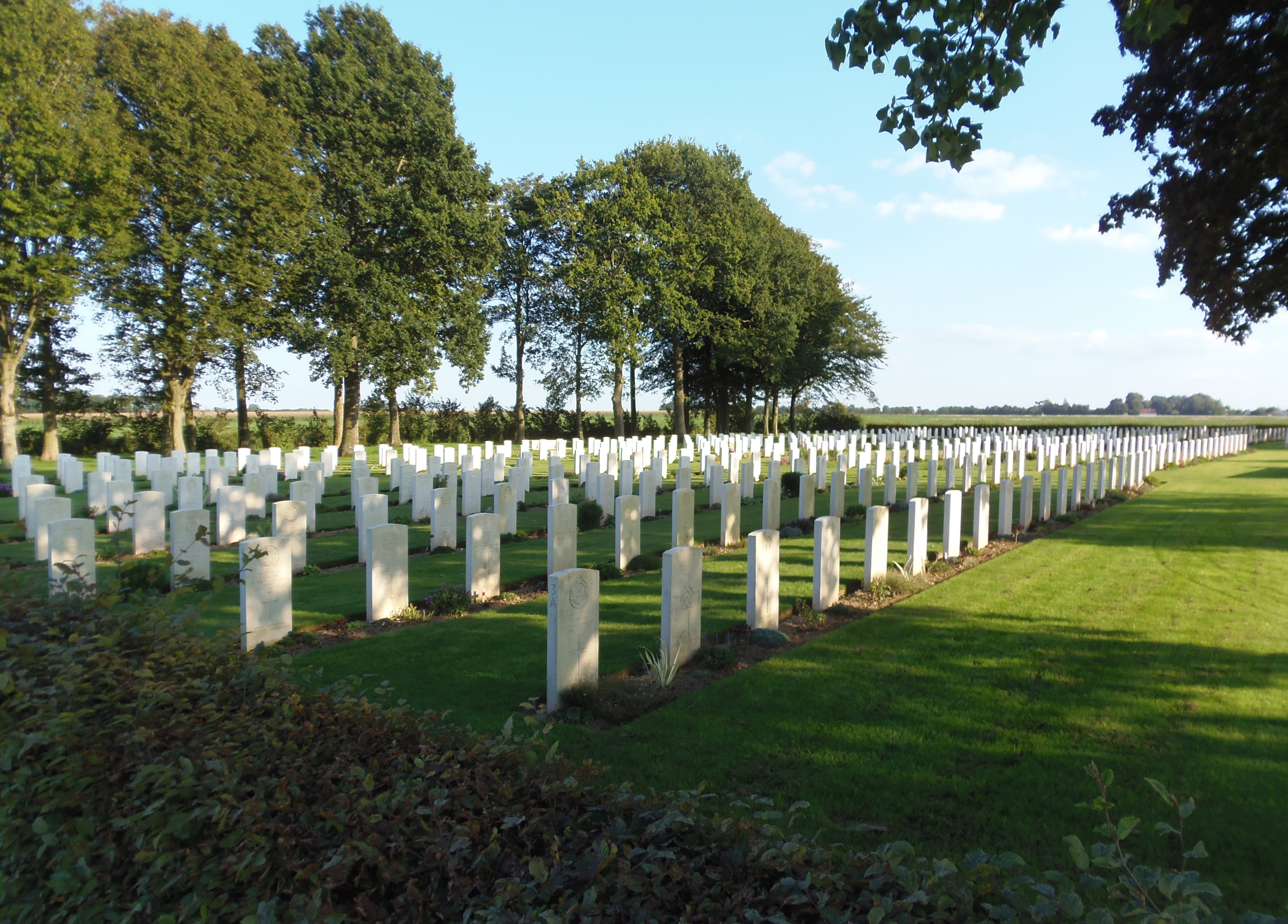
- For Operation Overlord
- Established: 1944
- Location: 49.1610°N 0.5603°W near Tessel, Calvados, France
- Designed by: Philip D. Hepworth
- Total burials: 519

Burials by nation
- United Kingdom: 456 Canada: 5 Germany: 59

Burials by war
- World War II

Fontenay-le-Pesnel War Cemetery is a Second World War cemetery of Commonwealth soldiers in France, located 16 km west of Caen, Normandy. The cemetery contains 461 commonwealth graves and 59 German graves.

== History ==
A large number of burials date to between the June and July 1944, during the Allied attacks to the west and southwest of Caen. A large number of the soldiers interred are from the South Staffordshire, East Lancashire and Royal Warwickshire Regiments plus the Durham Light Infantry.

The 59 German soldiers buried in the cemetery are mainly from the 12th SS Panzer Division Hitlerjugend.

== Location ==
The cemetery is one kilometre south-east of the hamlet of Saint-Martin, Fontenay-le-Pesnel, on the D.139, on the territory of Tessel.

== See also ==
- American Battle Monuments Commission
- UK National Inventory of War Memorials
- German War Graves Commission
- List of military cemeteries in Normandy
