= Mont-de-Huisnes German war cemetery =

Cemetery in Manche, France

- German War Graves Commission (Volksbund Deutsche Kriegsgräberfürsorge)
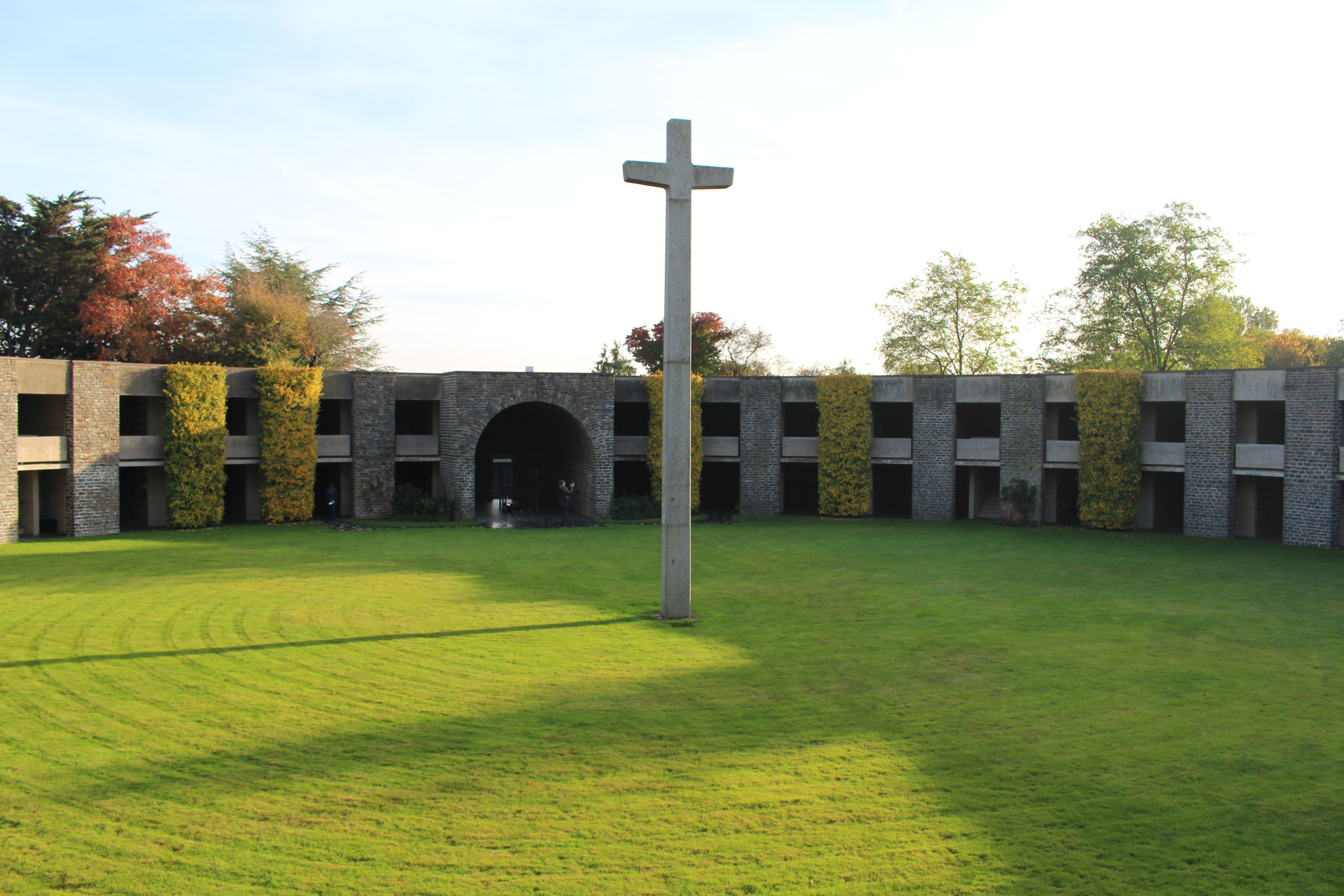
- The German military cemetery in Mont-de-Huisnes
- Used for those deceased 1961
- Established: 1961 (Finished 1963)
- Location: 48.6166°N 1.4539°W near Avranches, Manche, France

Burials by nation
- Germany

Burials by war
- World War II

Mont-de-Huisnes German war cemetery is a military war grave mausoleum, located 1 km north of Huisnes-sur-Mer and a few kilometres southwest of Avranches, France. It presently contains in nearly 12,000 burials of German military personnel of World War II, plus some women and children. It is maintained and managed by the German War Graves Commission.

== History ==
The cemetery, situated at the top of a 30m hill at Mont-de-Huisnes, is the only German crypt construction in France. In 1961, the Reburial Service of the German War Graves Commission interred German soldiers from numerous small graveyards and field graves to the mausoleum; including those previously buried in the French departments of Morbihan, Ille-et-Vilaine, Mayenne, Sarthe, Loir-et-Cher, Indre-et-Loire and Vienne as well as from the Channel Islands of Guernsey, Jersey, Alderney and Sark. The only exception was that the German graves located in the graveyard of Fort-George in Saint Peter Port on the island of Guernsey were not moved.

The circular crypt is 47m in diameter and constructed on two floors. Within the inner side of the crypt are 34 crypt rooms on each level containing 180 burials. The floors are connected by gangways and stairs. A large cross dominates the central grassed area. Opposite the entrance, steps lead onto up a natural terrace from which Mont-Saint-Michel can be viewed.

The names of the interred are placed on bronze tablets affixed to the walls of each crypt. The memorial was inaugurated on 14 September 1963.

== Photographs ==
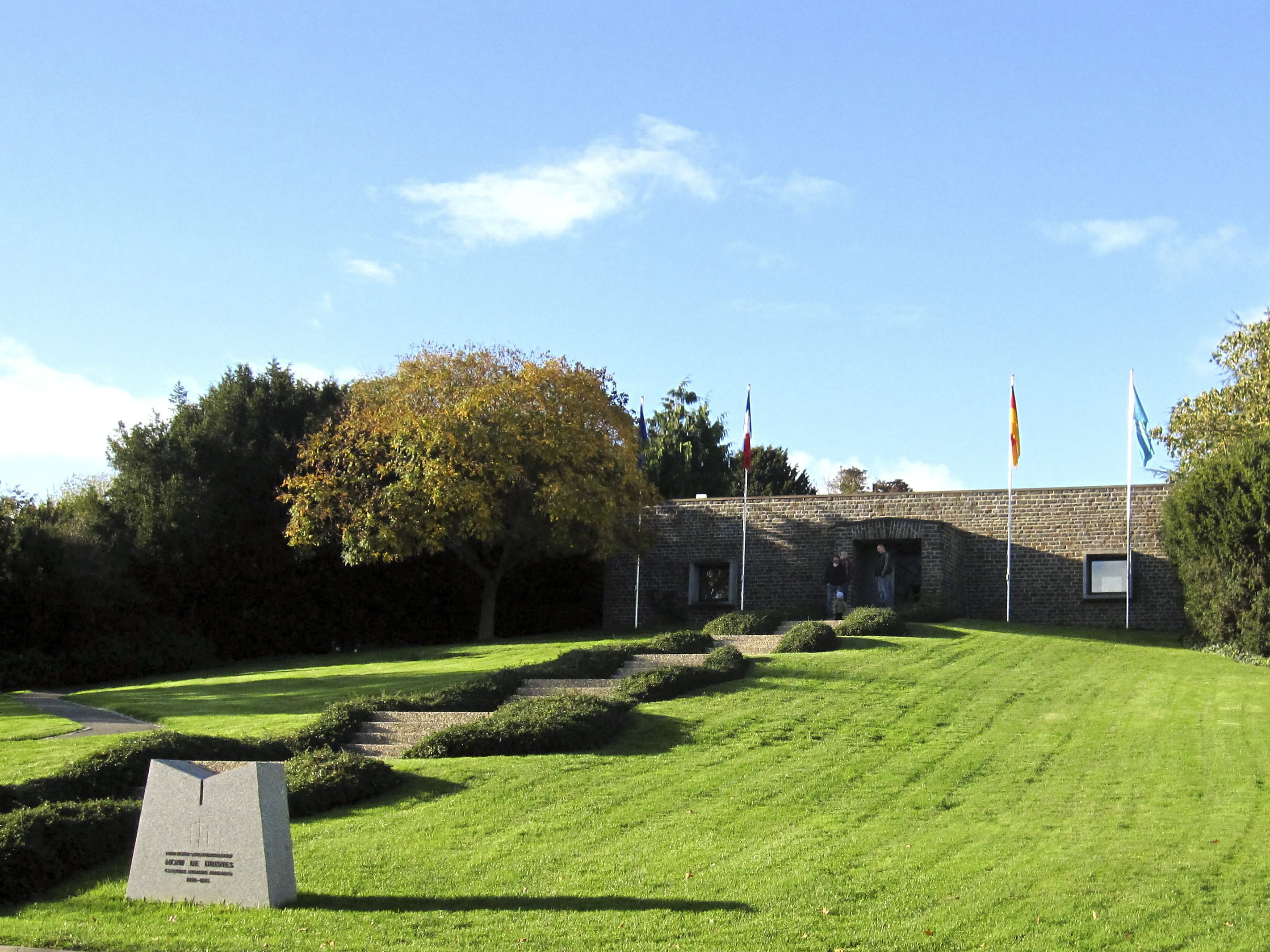
Entrance to Mont-de-Huisnes German war cemetery

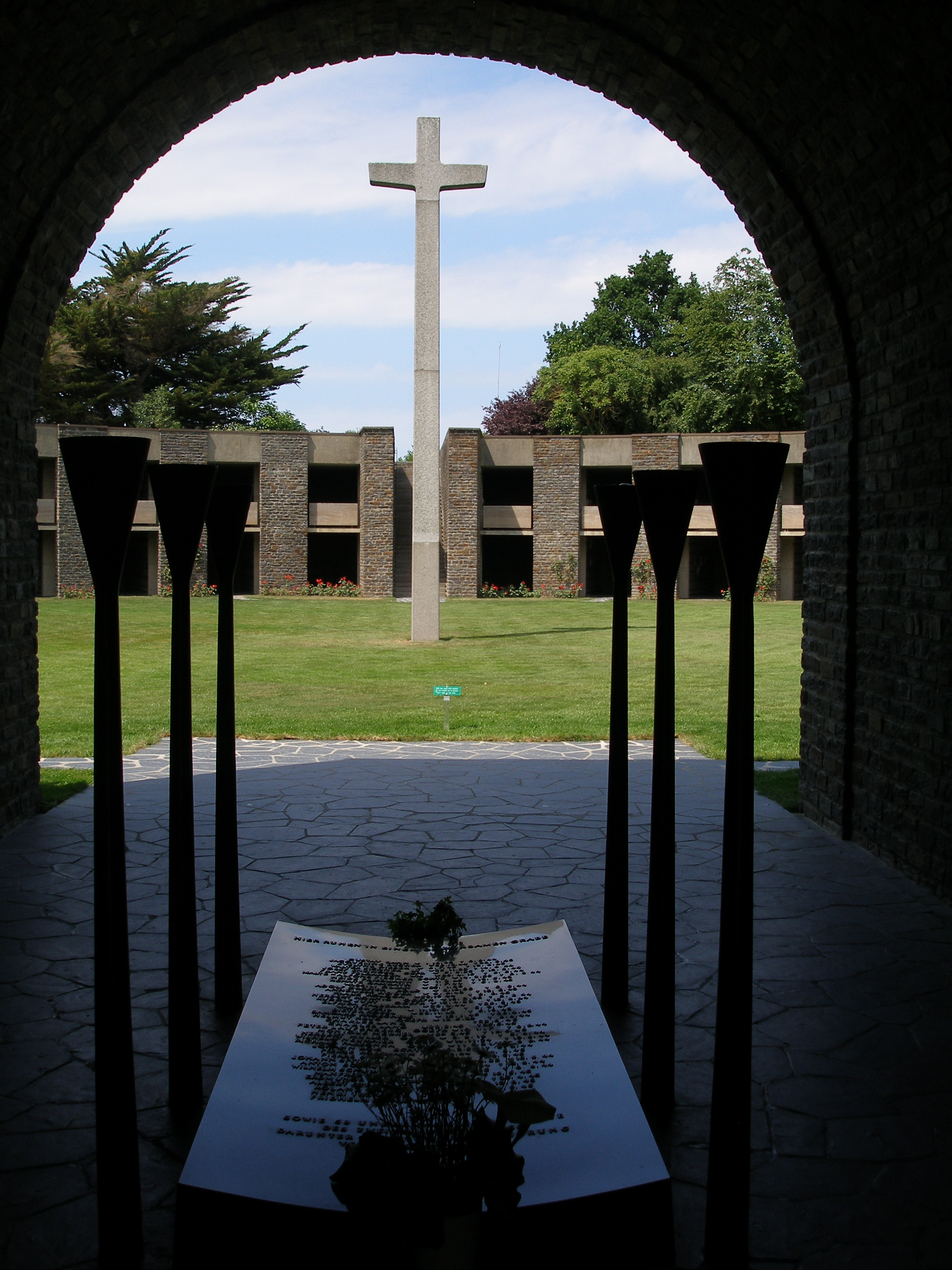
Entrance to central courtyard

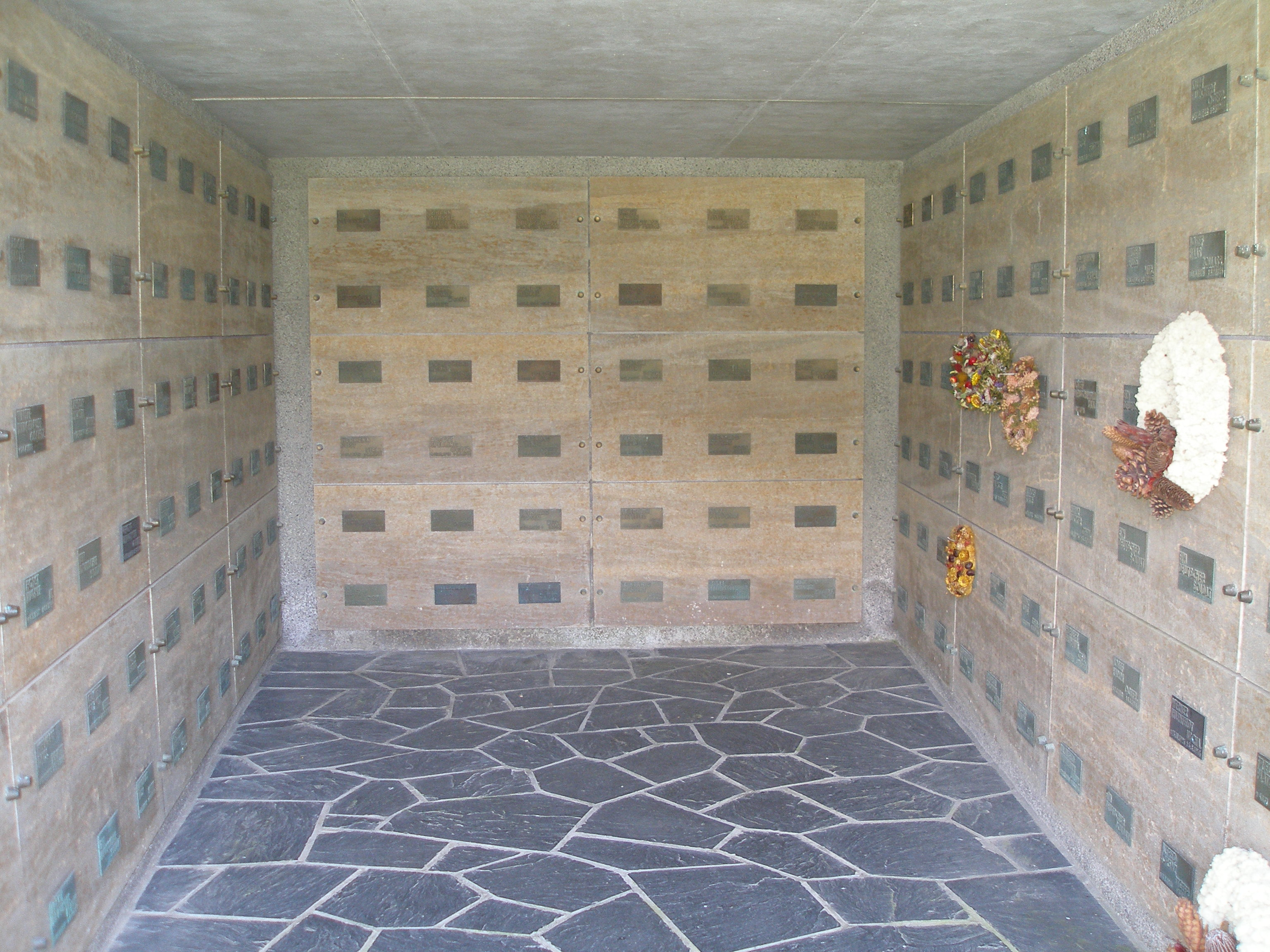
A crypt containing 180 burials

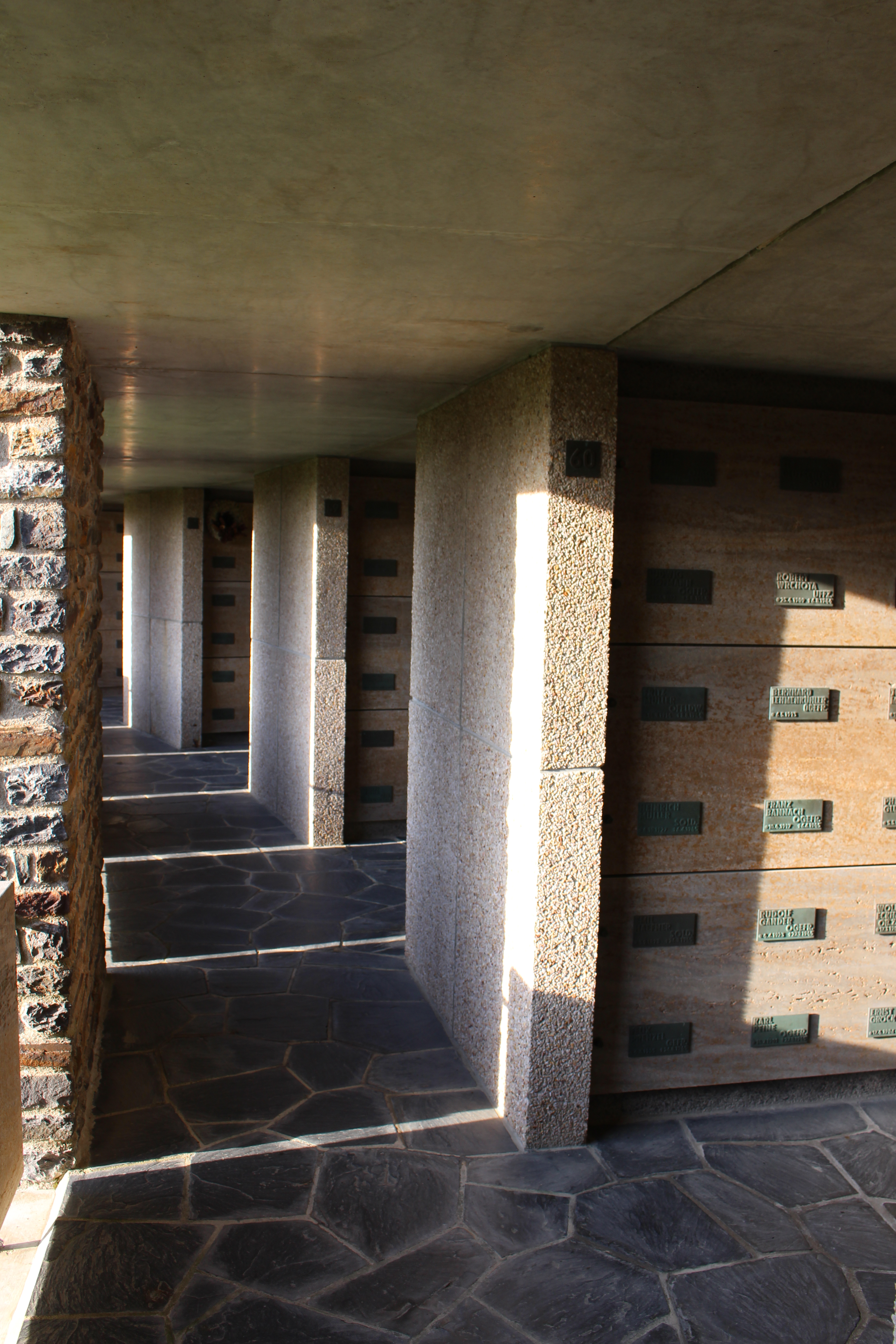
A gangway connecting the various crypts

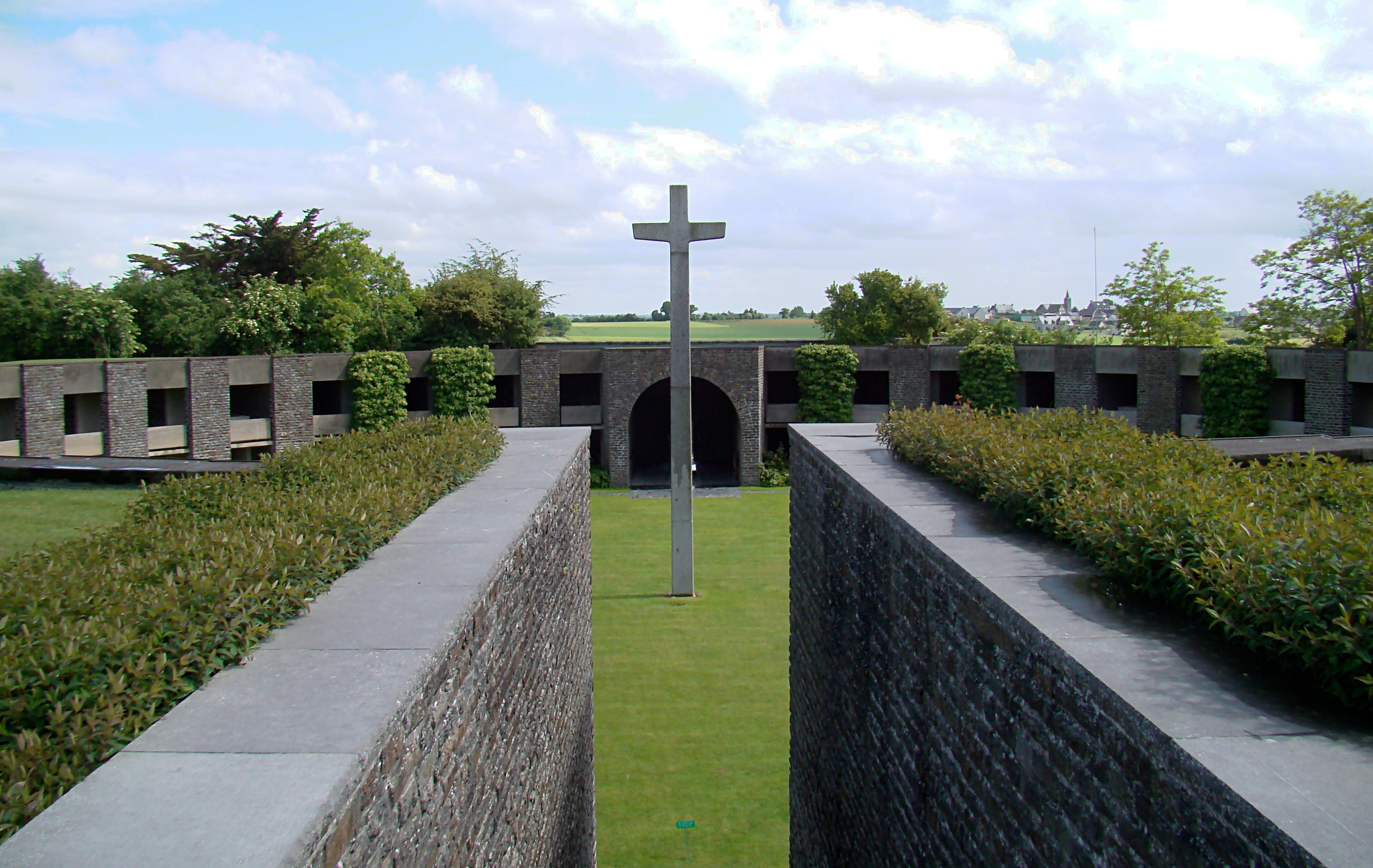
View of central courtyard from upper terrace

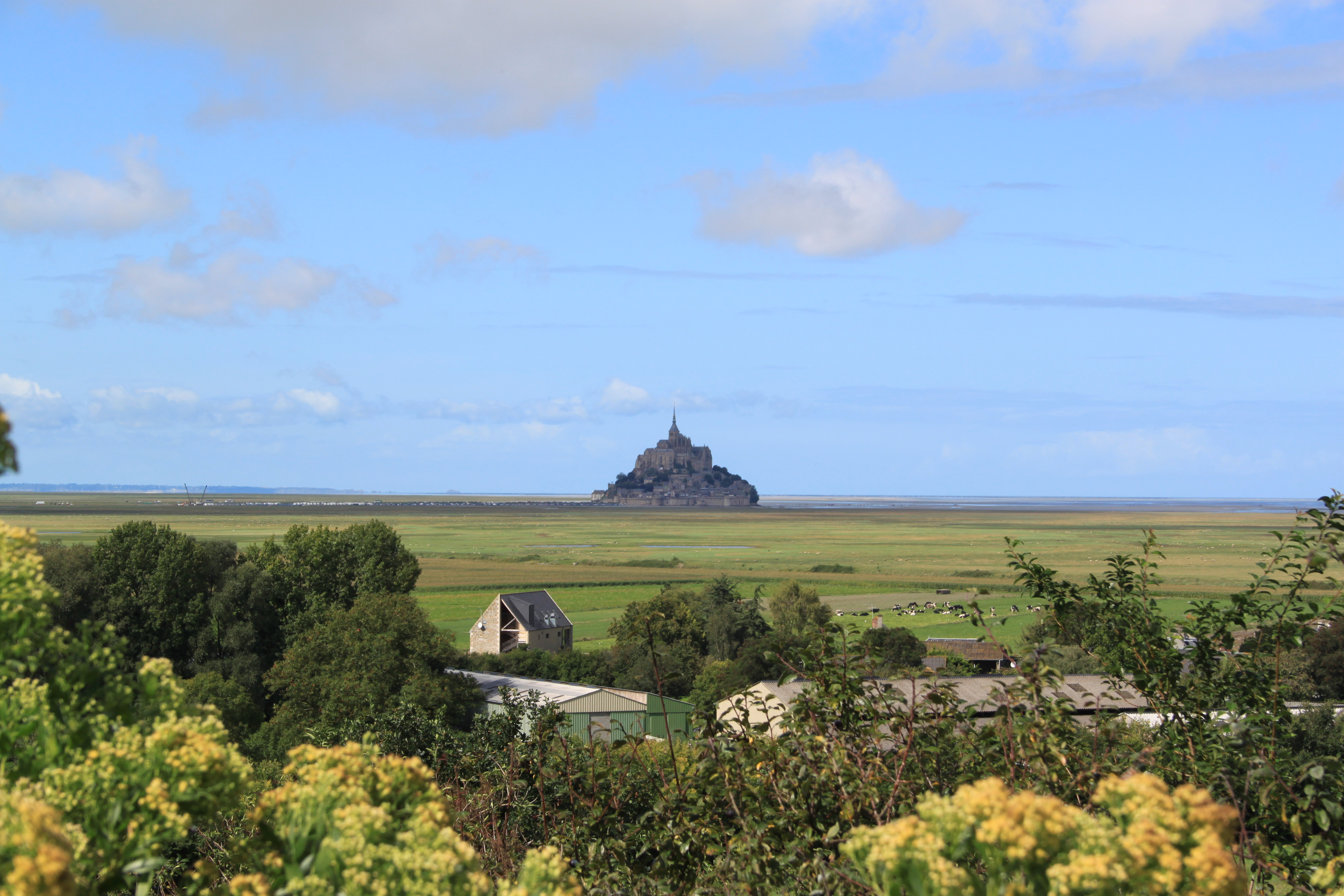
View of Mont-Saint-Michel

== Personal fates ==
The majority of the fallen in the graveyard date from the American advance during Operation Cobra and the subsequent American breakthrough at Avranches in July and August 1944.

== Volunteer maintenance ==
Unlike the American and Commonwealth War Graves Commissions, the German Commission is entirely voluntary and relies on gifts and collections to further its work. During the summer months one may see international school children tending the graves. They volunteer to work with the Volksbund during their school holidays and visit American and German war cemeteries, memorials, sites of the invasion and take part in the memorial ceremony with veterans and the mayor of La Cambe.

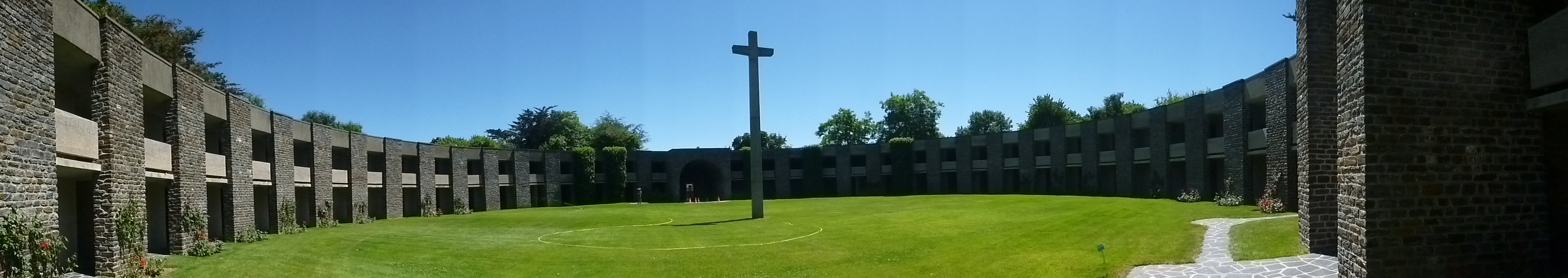
Panoramic photograph of the inner courtyard at Mont-de-Huisnes German war cemetery.

== See also ==
- List of military cemeteries in Normandy
