= Saint-Manvieu War Cemetery =

Military cemetery in France

- Commonwealth War Graves Commission
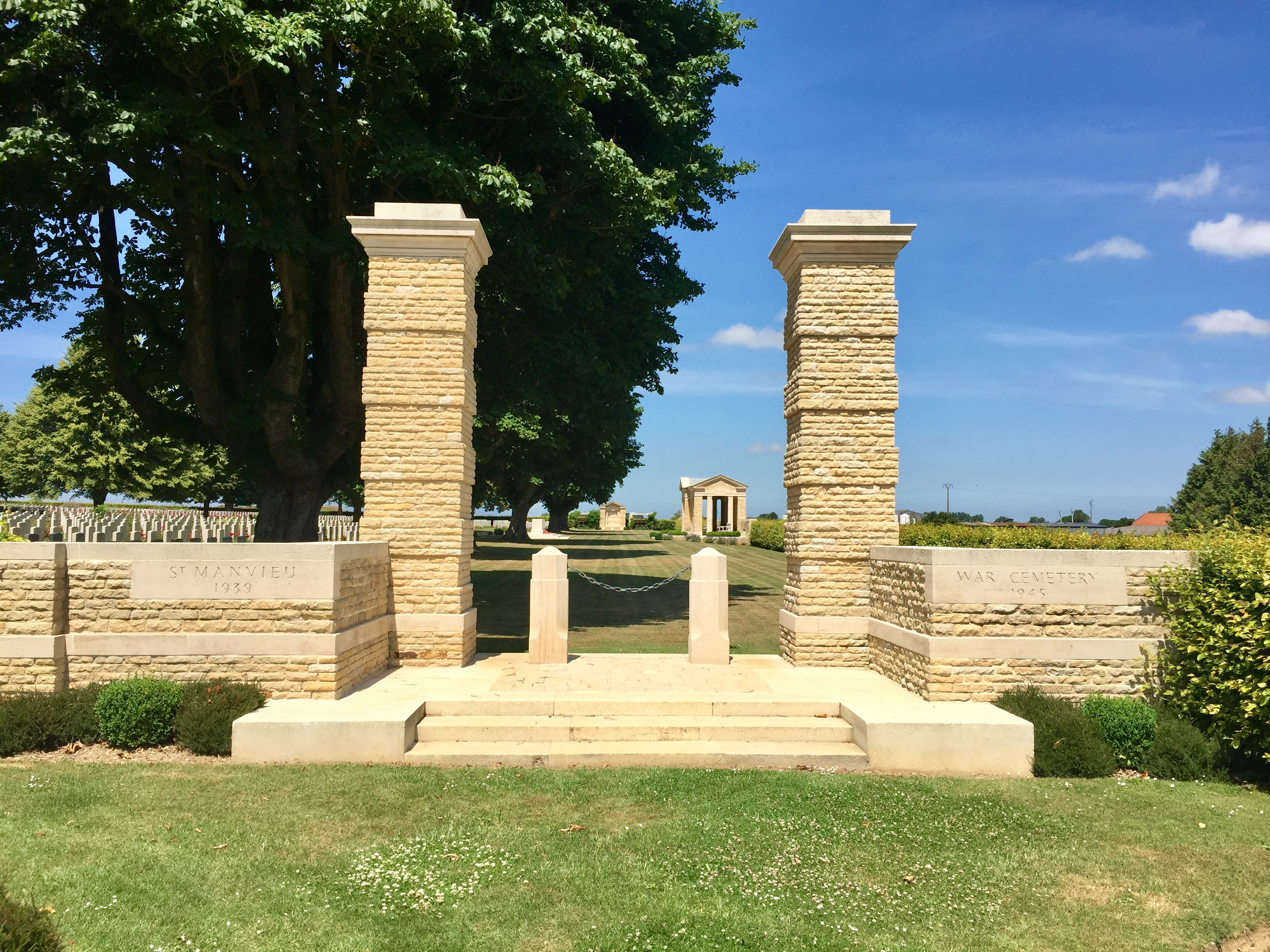
- Entrance
- Used for those deceased 1944
- Established: 1944
- Location: 49.1782°N 0.5143°W near Saint-Manvieu-Norrey, Calvados, France
- Designed by: Philip D. Hepworth
- Total burials: 2,182
- Unknowns: 135

Burials by nation
- United Kingdom: 1,575 Germany: 555; Canada: 3 Australia: 1 Unidentified Commonwealth: 48

Burials by war
- World War II

Saint-Manvieu War Cemetery is a British Second World War cemetery of Commonwealth soldiers in France, located 10 km west of Caen, Normandy. The cemetery's designation often uses the nearby commune of Cheux but the graveyard is actually closer to the commune of Saint-Manvieu-Norrey. The graveyard contains 1,627 Commonwealth war graves and 555 German war graves. The cemetery is maintained by the Commonwealth War Graves Commission.

== History ==
A large proportion of the soldiers buried here are from the battles that took place between Tilly-sur-Seulles and Caen from mid-June to late-July 1944. Key engagements at this time were Operations Epsom and Jupiter. The cemetery received its first interments in mid-June 1944.

== Location ==
The cemetery is 10 km west of Caen, on the D.9 (Rue de la Guinguette).

== See also ==
- American Battle Monuments Commission
- UK National Inventory of War Memorials
- German War Graves Commission
- List of military cemeteries in Normandy
