= Hottot-les-Bagues War Cemetery =

Military cemetery in France

- Commonwealth War Graves Commission
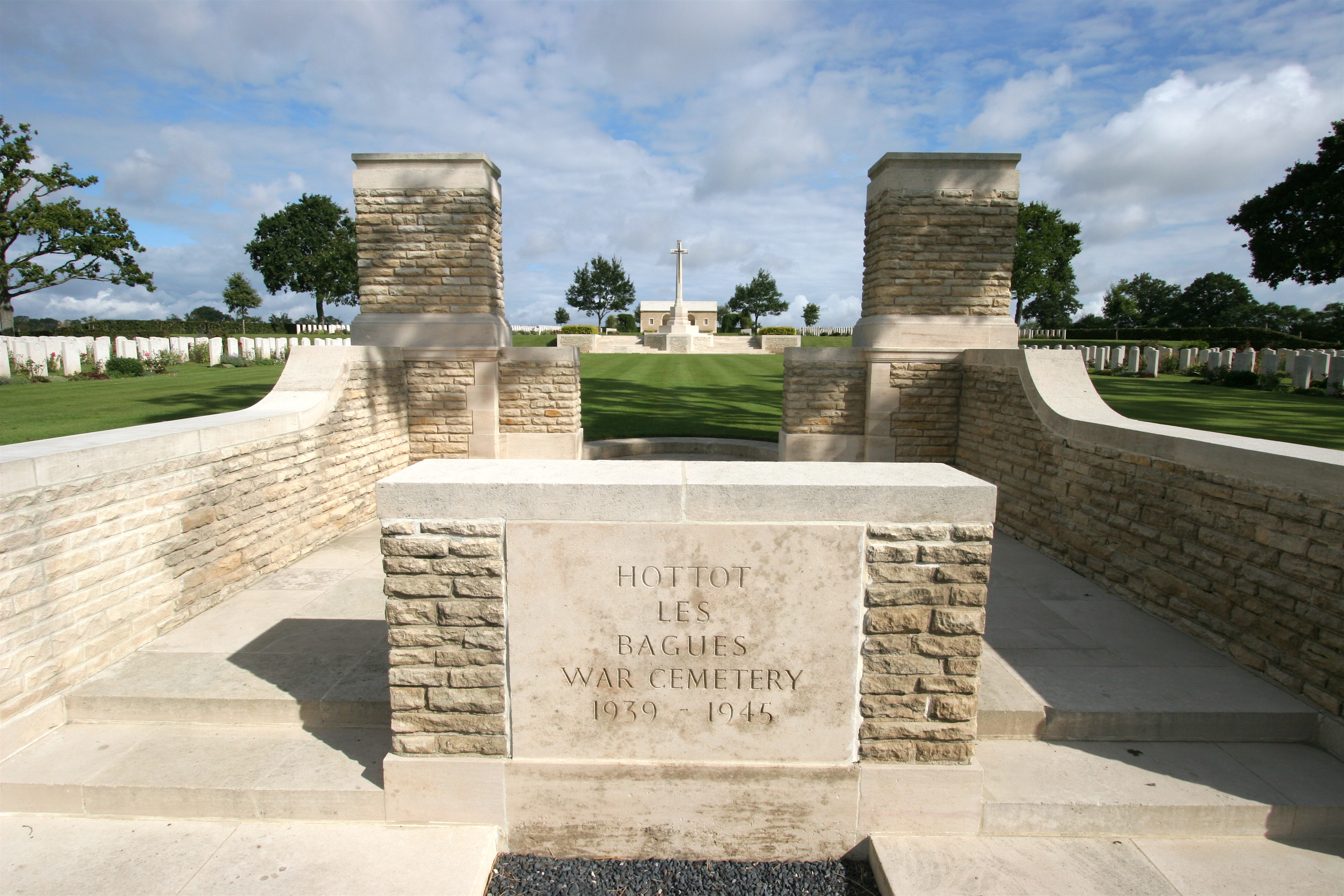
- Hottot-les-Bagues British war cemetery
- Used for those deceased 1944
- Established: 1944
- Location: 49.1608°N 0.6264°W near Hottot-les-Bagues, Calvados, France
- Designed by: Philip D. Hepworth
- Total burials: 1,005
- Unknowns: 56

Burials by nation
- United Kingdom: 965 Canada: 34; Australia: 3 New Zealand: 2 South Africa: 1 Germany: 132

Burials by war
- World War II

Hottot-les-Bagues War Cemetery is a British Second World War cemetery of Commonwealth soldiers in France, located 15 km south-west of Bayeux, Normandy. The cemetery contains 1,005 commonwealth war graves and 132 German war graves.

== History ==
The majority of the soldiers interred in the cemetery were killed in late June and July 1944 as the Allies pushed south of Bayeux and then south-west to encircle Caen. Many casualties were involved in fighting around Tilly-sur-Seulles.

Two brigadiers are interred in the cemetery; John Roland Mackintosh-Walker of the Seaforth Highlanders and James Hargest from the Royal New Zealand Infantry Regiment.

Casualties not just from the battles to encircle Caen, but from Operation Bluecoat. There are 24 Scots Guards (3rd Battalion) buried within, most lost their lives on hill 226 (now renumbered 232) near Les Loges on the push south from Caumont. These soldiers were in a tank battalion, part of the 6th Guards tank Brigade. Using Churchill & Stuart tanks.

== Location ==
The cemetery is 14 km south-east of Bayeux, between Hottot-les-Bagues and Juvigny-sur-Seulles on the D.9 road.

== See also ==
- American Battle Monuments Commission
- UK National Inventory of War Memorials
- German War Graves Commission
- List of military cemeteries in Normandy
