= Ryes War Cemetery =

Military cemetery in France

- Commonwealth War Graves Commission
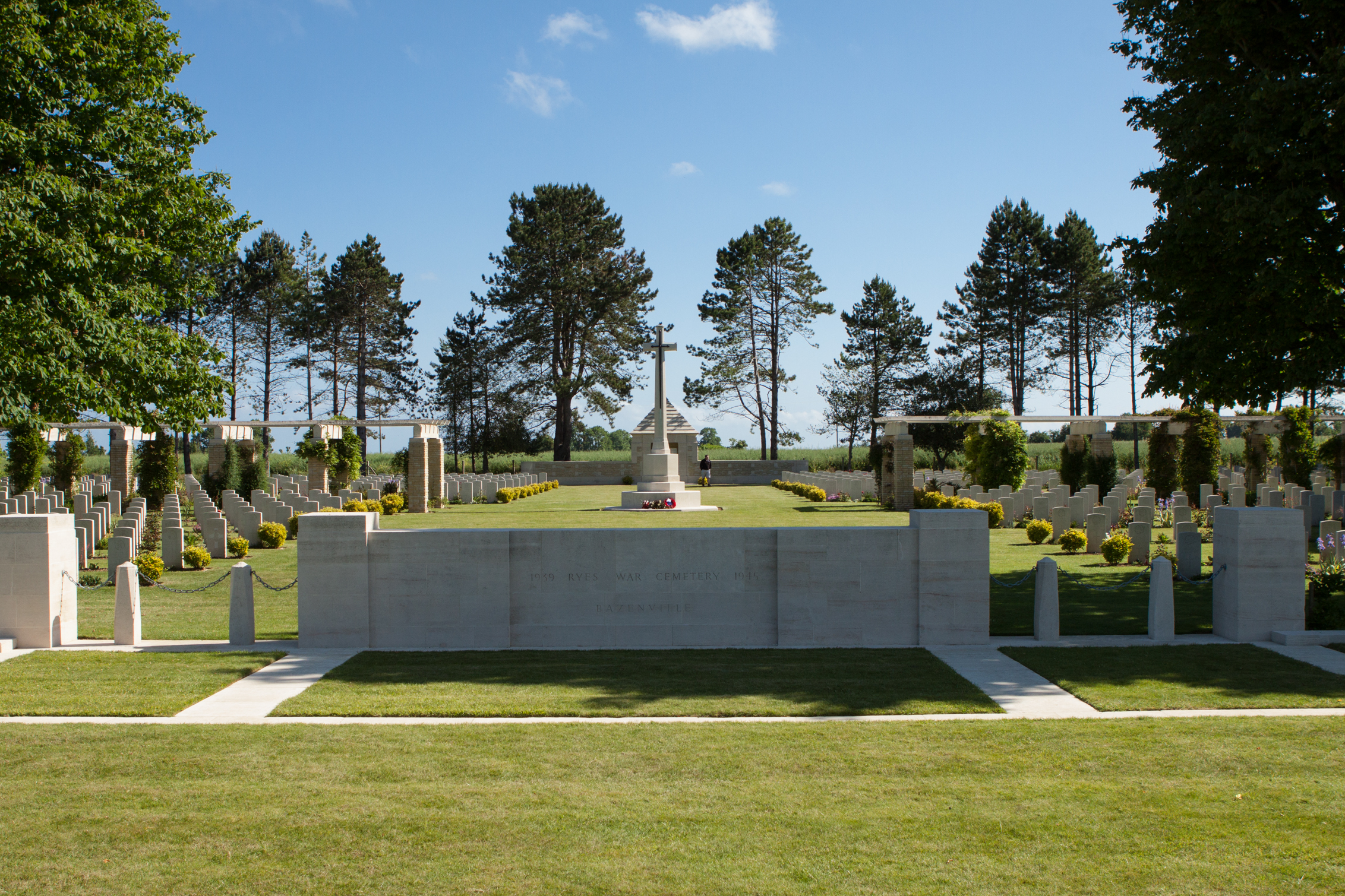
- Entrance to the war cemetery
- Used for those deceased 1944
- Established: 1944
- Location: 49.3002°N 0.6008°W near Bazenville, Calvados, France
- Designed by: Philip D. Hepworth
- Total burials: 979
- Unknowns: 67

Burials by nation
- United Kingdom: 630 Canada: 21; Australia: 1 Poland: 1 Germany: 335

Burials by war
- World War II

Ryes War Cemetery is a Second World War cemetery of Commonwealth soldiers located close to the commune of Bazenville, 8 km (5.0 mi) east of Bayeux, Normandy, France. The graveyard contains 653 Commonwealth war graves, one Polish and 335 German war graves. The cemetery is maintained by the Commonwealth War Graves Commission.

== History ==
The cemetery lies close to the town of Arromanches and the first interments in the cemetery were made two days after the initial D-Day landings on 6 June 1944. Some of the soldiers buried here are from the 50th (Northumbrian) Infantry Division that landed on Gold Beach. The cemetery also contains a large number of Royal Navy and merchant navy sailors.

Two brothers, Private Joseph Casson (Durham Light Infantry) and Marine Robert Casson (45 Commando) are buried beside each other in the graveyard. Professional footballer Les Milner is also buried in the cemetery.

== Gallery ==
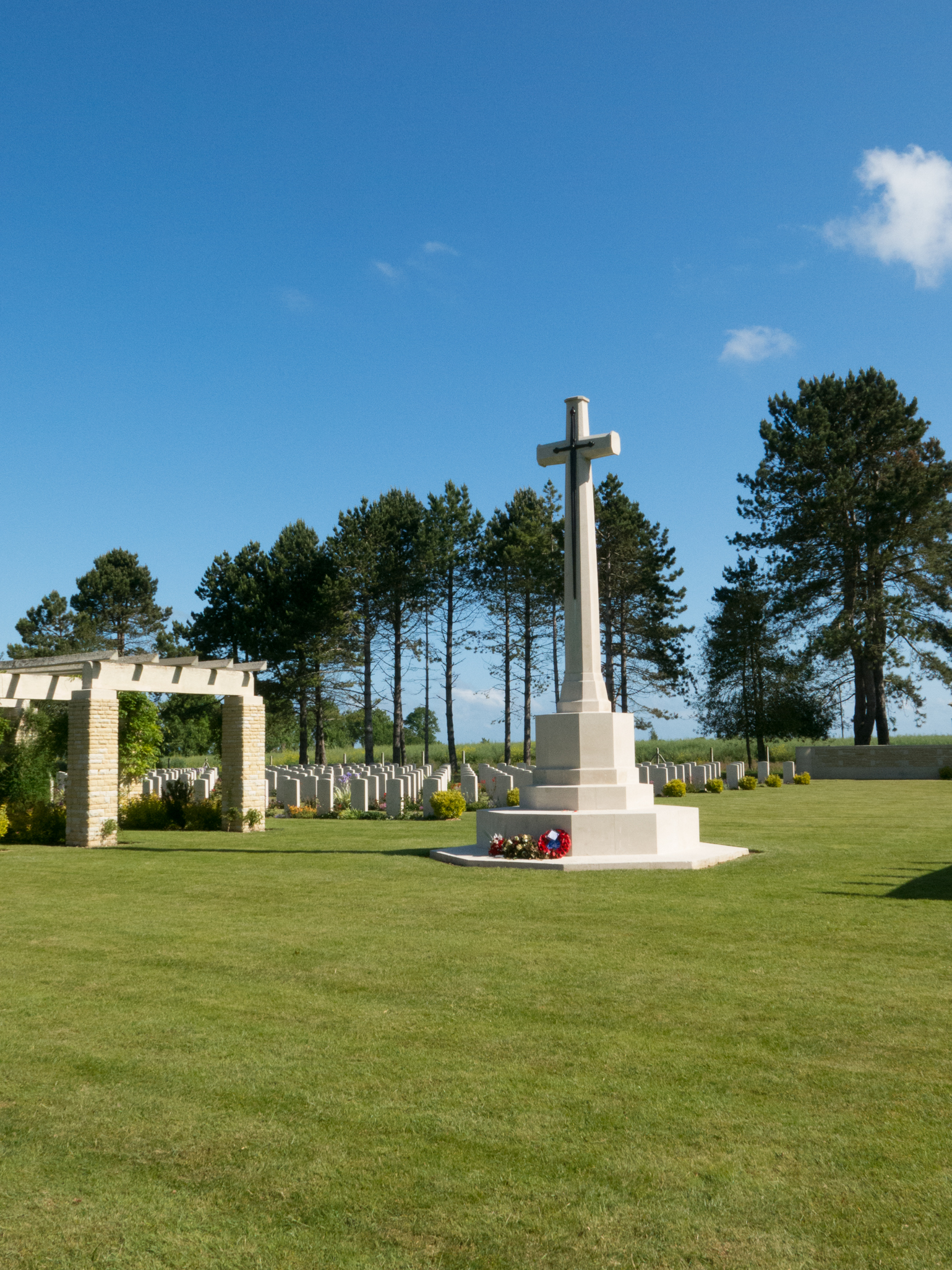
Sacrificial cross in the cemetery

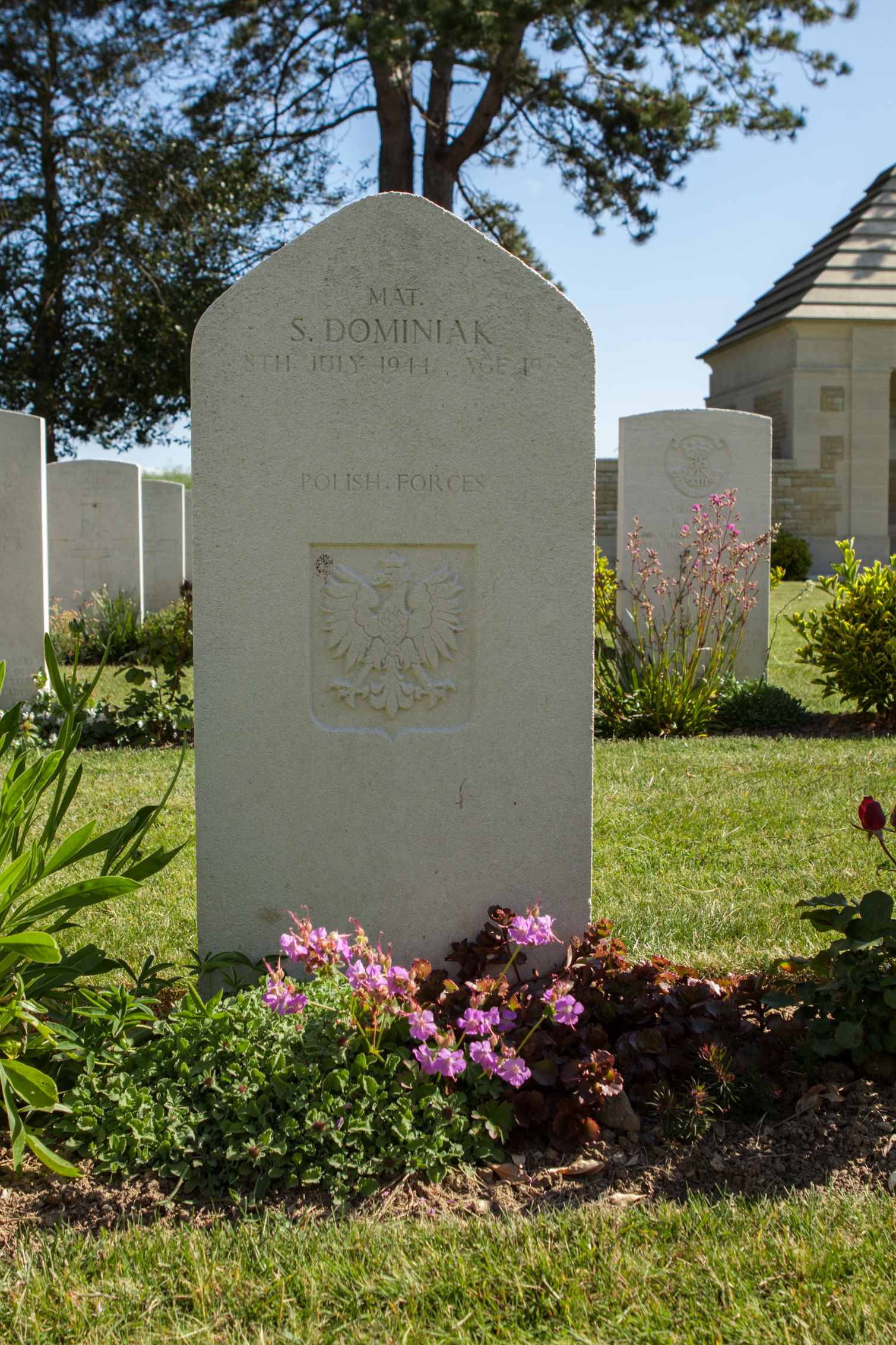
Polish headstone

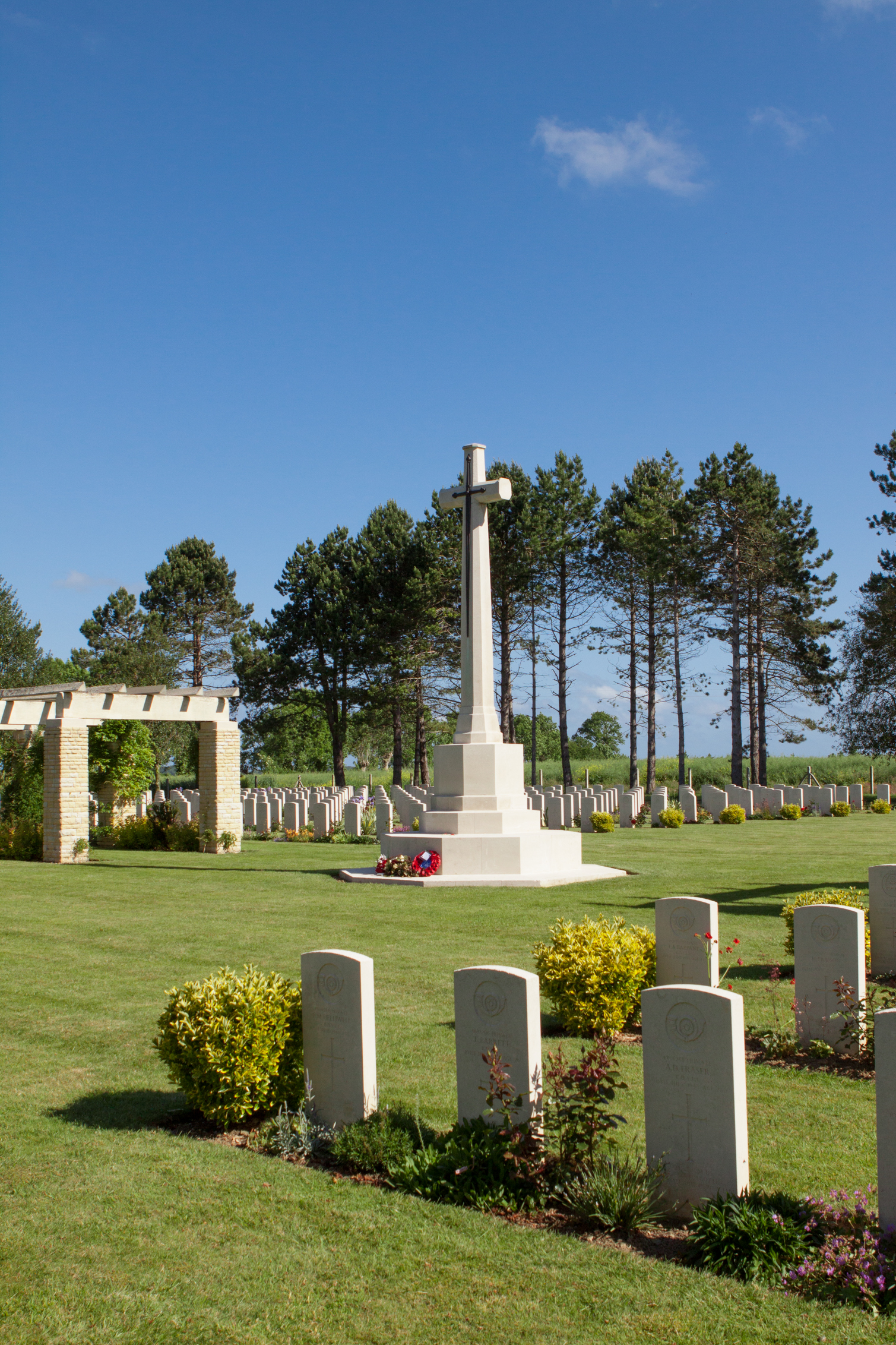
Graves and cross

== Location ==
The cemetery is 8 km (5.0 mi) east of Bayeux, close to Bazenville on the D.87.

== See also ==
- List of military cemeteries in Normandy
- American Battle Monuments Commission
- UK National Inventory of War Memorials
- German War Graves Commission
