= Les Gateys National Cemetery =

National necropolis in Orne, France

- Ministere des Anciens Combattants et Victimes de Guerre
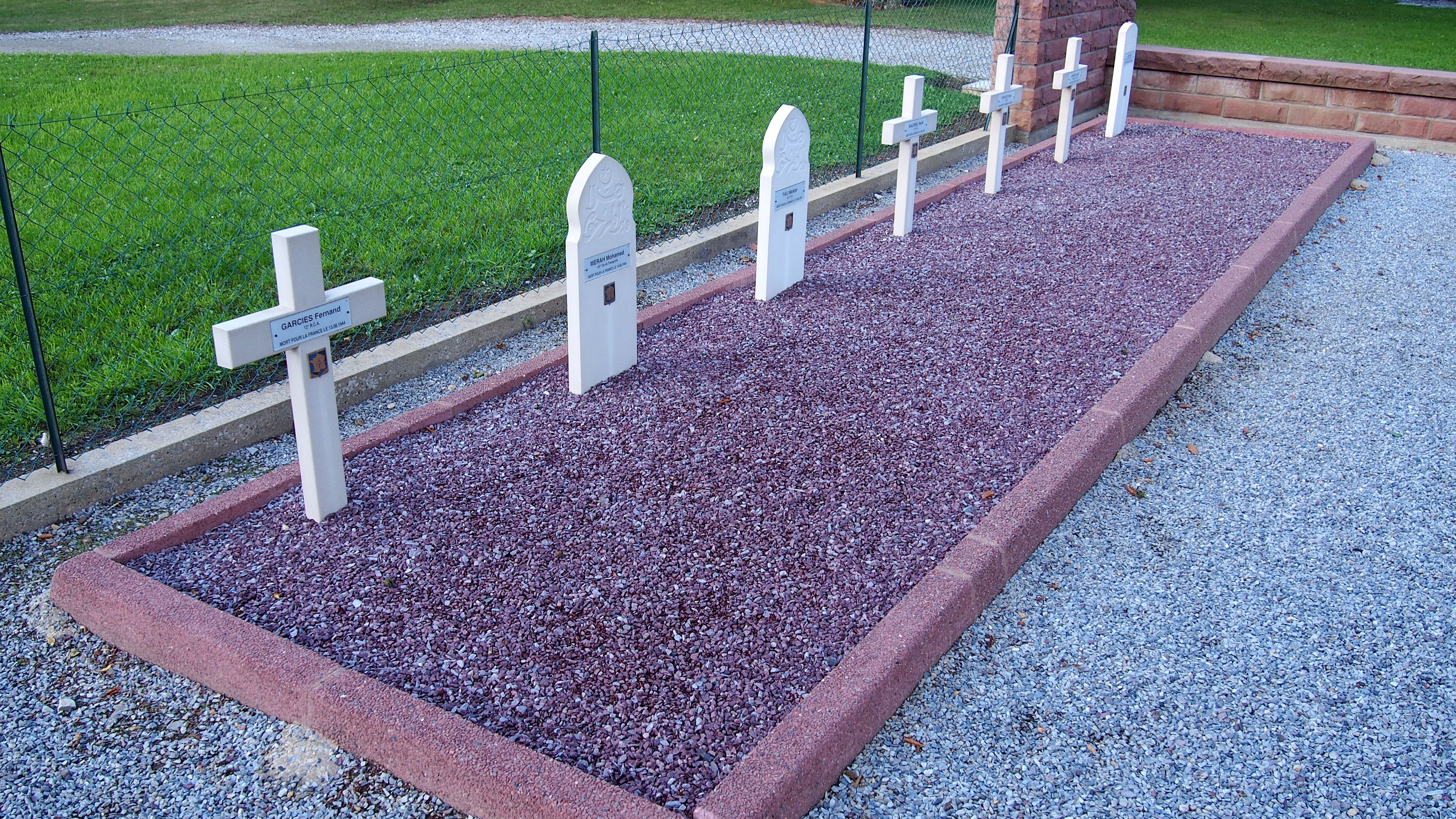
- Seven graves in the cemetery
- Used for those deceased 1944
- Established: 1944 (inaugurated 1970)
- Location: 48°29′39″N 00°00′59″W near Alençon, Normandy, France
- Total burials: 19

Burials by nation
- France

Burials by war
- World War II 19

Les Gateys National Cemetery (also called Les Gateys National Necropolis (French: Nécropole Nationale des Gateys)) is a Second World War French military war grave cemetery, located close to the village of Saint-Nicolas-des-Bois and 5.5 km (3.4 mi) north-west of Alençon in the Orne, Normandy, France. It contains the graves of 19 French soldiers from the 2nd Armoured Division that died during the Battle of Alençon in August 1944.

== History ==
The soldiers interred in this small cemetery were part of General Philippe Leclerc de Hauteclocque's French 2nd Armoured Division. The division had landed on 1 August 1944 at Saint-Martin-de-Varreville, close to Utah Beach. The division was involved in the encirclement of German forces in what became known as the Falaise Pocket. The soldiers here were killed during the Battle of Alençon in August 1944. The division later played a major part in the liberation of Paris.

== Formation ==
The site, located in the forest of Écouves, was originally a battlefield cemetery created in August 1944 for five fallen French soldiers. In 1968 and 1969 the remains of 14 soldiers, previously buried in communal cemeteries in the Orne department, were reburied at Les Gateys. The cemetery also has a memorial plaque naming 69 soldiers of 2nd French Armoured Division who died fighting in the Orne department. The inauguration of the national cemetery took place on 15 March 1970, in the presence of General Leclerc's widow Madame la Maréchale Leclerc and General Jacques Massu and the site is maintained by the French state (Ministere des Anciens Combattants et Victimes de Guerre).

== See also ==
- List of military cemeteries in Normandy
