= Les Milner =

English footballer

Personal information
- Full name: Leonard Milner
- Date of birth: 15 September 1917
- Place of birth: York, England
- Date of death: 25 June 1944 (aged 26)
- Place of death: near Bayeux, German-occupied France
- Position: Inside forward

Senior career*
Years	Team	Apps	(Gls)
1936	York Railway Institute	1	(0)
	Hull City	0	(0)
1937–1939	York City	12	(4)
- * Club domestic league appearances and goals

Leonard "Les" Milner (15 September 1917 – 25 June 1944) was an English professional footballer player who played as an inside forward in the Football League for York City.

== Personal life ==
Milner was married. During the Second World War, he served as a sergeant in the Seaforth Highlanders and was killed near Bayeux in the Battle of Normandy on 25 June 1944. He is buried at Ryes War Cemetery, Bazenville.

== Career statistics ==
Appearances and goals by club, season and competition
Club	Season	League			FA Cup		Total	
Club	Season	Division	Apps	Goals	Apps	Goals	Apps	Goals
York City	1937–38	Third Division North	2	0	0	0	2	0
York City	1938–39	Third Division North	10	4	0	0	10	4
Career total			12	4	0	0	12	4
