= Huisnes-sur-Mer =

- Commune
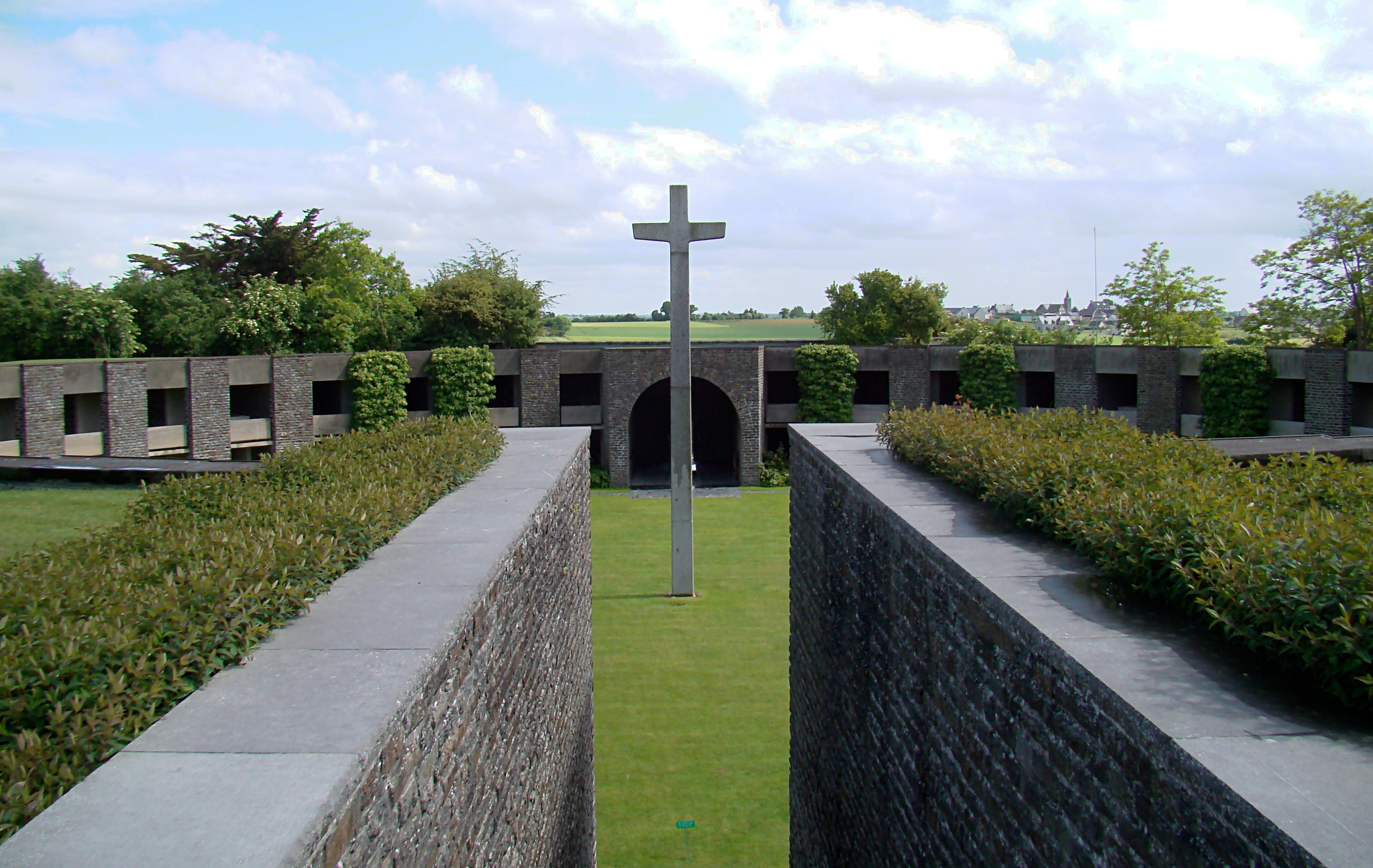
- German War Grave of Huisnes-sur-Mer; hosting 11.956 German dead of World War II

- Coat of arms
- Location of Huisnes-sur-Mer
- Location within France Location within Normandy
- Coordinates: 48°36′33″N 1°26′57″W
- Country: France
- Region: Normandy
- Department: Manche
- Arrondissement: Avranches
- Canton: Pontorson
- Intercommunality: CA Mont-Saint-Michel-Normandie

Government
  - Mayor (2020–2026): Yann Rabasté
- Area^{1}: 6.75 km^{2} (2.61 sq mi)
- Elevation: 33 m (108 ft)
- Highest elevation: 38 m (125 ft)
- Lowest elevation: 6 m (20 ft)
- Population (2023): 169
  - Density: 25.0/km^{2} (64.8/sq mi)
- Time zone: UTC+01:00 (CET)
  - Summer (DST): UTC+02:00 (CEST)
- INSEE/Postal code: 50253 /50170
- ^{1} French Land Register data, which excludes lakes, ponds, glaciers > 1 km^{2} (0.386 sq mi or 247 acres) and river estuaries.

Huisnes-sur-Mer (French pronunciation: [ɥin syʁ mɛʁ], literally Huisnes on Sea) is a commune in the Manche department in north-western France.

== See also ==
- Communes of the Manche department
