= War Memorials Register =

Database of war memorials in the UK, Channel Islands and Isle of Man

Memorial to Lieutenant J. Manners, Clovelly, Devon. WM reference 25898

The War Memorials Register (WMR), formerly the UK National Inventory of War Memorials, was founded in 1989 to build a comprehensive record of every war memorial in the United Kingdom, the Isle of Man and the Channel Islands.

== Overview ==
Based at the Imperial War Museums (IWM) in London, the database has so far recorded over 68,000 war memorials. These records are available in an online database available on the IWM website. It is a volunteer-led project, with a group of volunteers based at the IWM and fieldworkers from around the country working to record and update war memorial information.

The key information recorded includes: location, description, category, inscription, names recorded and photographs.

War memorials are defined as any tangible object which has been erected or dedicated to commemorate war, conflict, victory or peace; or casualties who served in, were affected by or killed as a result of war, conflict or peacekeeping; or those who died as a result of accident or disease whilst engaged in military service. This includes memorials to civilian casualties and animals. While most memorials commemorate the First and Second World Wars, all conflicts are covered, from the Roman conquest of Britain to current-day actions in Iraq and Afghanistan.

The WMR is working to compile a comprehensive online record of all war memorials in the UK, together with the names of the individuals whom they commemorate.

== See also ==
- Commonwealth War Graves Commission
- Railway war memorials in the United Kingdom
- The War Graves Photographic Project
- Scottish War Memorials
