= Glencree Centre for Peace and Reconciliation =

Coordinates: 53.19913°N 6.29215°W

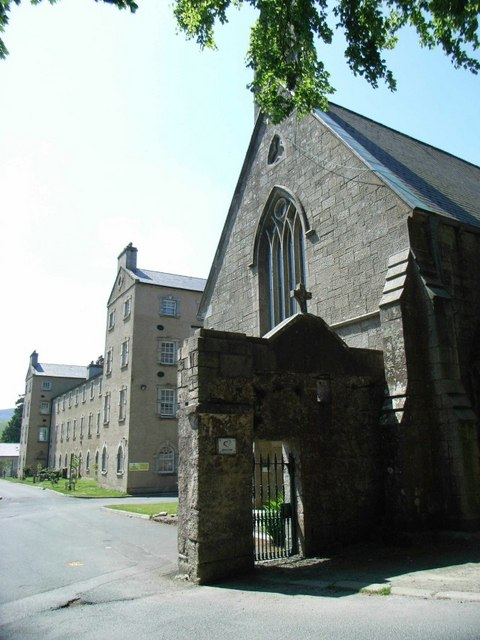
- Founded: 1974
- Type: Non-profit
- Location: The Glencree Centre for Peace and Reconciliation, Glencree, Enniskerry, County Wicklow, A98 D635, Ireland
- Services: Facilitating Dialogues, Peace Education, Peace-building, Women's Leadership, Intercultural and Refugee Supports, International Work etc.
- Fields: reconciliation, peace-building, building community
- Key people: Ciarán Ó Cuinn (Chair) Naoimh McNamee (CEO) Gerry Cahill (CFO) Pat Fleming (Caretaker)
- Website: https://glencree.ie/

The Glencree Centre for Peace and Reconciliation is the Republic of Ireland's only peacebuilding centre. It has been resolving conflict through the power of dialogue since its founding in 1974.

Established as a response to the conflict in Northern Ireland, the Glencree Centre for Peace and Reconciliation works to prevent and transform political and inter-communal conflict and build peaceful, inclusive societies.

The Glencree teams bring individuals and groups impacted by conflict together and help them find pathways to reconciliation and sustained peace through the humanising power of facilitated dialogue, relationship-building, public discourse and shared learning.

The centre is a not-for-profit organisation and registered charity, located near Enniskerry, in the Glencree Valley, County Wicklow.

The Armoury Café is open on the site from Wednesday to Sunday from 9.30am to 5.30pm for light refreshments and is a popular destination for visitors, hikers and cyclists.

Glencree Centre logo

== History ==
=== Military Road and Glencree Barracks, the early 1800's ===
In late 1803, five barracks were built along Military Road to ensure it would not fall into local insurgent hands or to foreign enemies. The barracks at Glencree was one of the smaller of these buildings, designed to accommodate a captain and 100 soldiers. When it was completed in 1806, it housed 75 military men. Some £26,000 had been invested in the five barracks which, like Military Road, became wholly obsolete in 1815 when the Napoleonic Wars ended.

=== St. Kevin's Reformatory School, 1850 to 1940 ===
In the 1850s, Ireland was recovering from the Great Famine. Poverty and deprivation were widespread, and young people and children suffered greatly. In desperation, many of them fell foul of the law. A high increase in the juvenile 'crime' of stealing food or vagrancy saw prison numbers increase leading to a public outcry.

The British government responded by passing the Irish Reformatory Schools Act in 1858, extending to Ireland the system that prevailed in England. Lord Powerscourt, owner of the land at Glencree, offered a lease on the abandoned barracks.

The religious order, the Oblates of Mary Immaculate, agreed to establish St. Kevin's Reformatory on the site. The first superior, Fr. Francis Lynch, took over Glencree in 1858 and rebuilt the property to house up to 300 boys. They toiled hard to reclaim and cultivate more than 100 acres of land surrounding the reformatory. The boys received some basic education and skills training in the school and workshops built on the site. Fr. Lynch also assembled a 50-strong brass, fife and drum band and choir that played for the local community and at competitions around the country.

The reformatory closed it doors in 1940, when the staff and boys moved to Daingean Industrial School, County Offaly. The complex then served for a brief time as an Oblate novitiate before passing into the ownership of the Minister of Supply.

Operation Shamrock, 1945 to 1950

In the aftermath of World War II until 1950, Glencree became a temporary refuge for children who were evacuated from war-torn Germany, Poland and Austria by the Irish Red Cross. While many of the children who arrived were orphaned by the war, many others were sent into this temporary foster care in Ireland by parents who faced homelessness, lack of food, and were traumatised as a consequence of the war.

It is thought that close to one thousand children, aged from five to fifteen, travelled overland through mainland Europe and arrived by mail boat into Dun Laoghaire before continuing their journey by road to Glencree. The children were malnourished when they arrived, some were near death. Under the care of the French Sisters of Charity, they stayed at Glencree for a period of recuperation, rest and orientation. With health restored, they travelled onward again into the care of foster families throughout Ireland who had responded to newspaper advertisements placed by the Irish Red Cross.

According to the Committee of the International Red Cross in Geneva, “The Irish people raised a sum of twelve million pounds for the victims of the second World War which is equivalent to £4 per head of the entire population of the country. That was the largest single donation from any country for post-war relief.”

While the majority of the children were reunited with their families after approximately three years, some remained with their foster families and continued their lives in Ireland.

=== Una O'Higgins O'Malley, 1927 to 2005 ===
A lifelong campaigner for peace and justice, Una O'Higgins O'Malley was a founding member of the Glencree Centre for Peace and Reconciliation. Una's father, Kevin O'Higgins, was Minister for Justice in the first government after partition. He was shot dead in 1927 by anti-treaty forces on his way to mass. His own father had been shot three years previously because of his son's political involvement. As recounted to Una by a relative of the assassin, her father's dying words were: 'I know who you are and I know why you have done this, but this has got to be the end of killing'.

Just five months old when her father was murdered, Una dedicated her life to building relationships of trust between both traditions on this island. She believed that our security depended on the quality of those relationships, not the size and quantity of our weapons, or the strength of our tribe. Una died in 2005 after a long and happy life surrounded by family.

== Glencree Programme Work ==
The Glencree Centre has a range of programmes that evolve and change with time. These include: Community and Political Dialogue, Women's Leadership, Peace Education and Young Adults, Peace IV: Addressing the Legacy of Violence Through Facilitated Dialogue, Southern Voice for Peace, Intercultural and Refugee, and International.

The Glencree Site comprises a complex of historical old buildings that each played many previous roles over the last three centuries.

== In literature ==
In the guide book "Ireland (Part I)" from 1909, the travel writer M. J. B. Baddeley briefly details the reformatory and the vista around Glencree:

The Reformatory (shown to visitors) was originally a barrack, but was converted to its present purpose in 1859. From it we look right down the Glencree valley to the sea, and can imagine the utter desolation and bleakness of this spot in winter.

== See also ==
- Glencree German war cemetery, a nearby cemetery, containing the graves of German army personnel from both world wars

== Sources ==
- Baddeley, M. J. B. (1909). Thorough Guide Series. Ireland (Part I). Northern Counties including Dublin and Neighbourhood. Edinburgh: Thomas Nelson and Sons, London, Edinburgh, Dublin and New York.
