= Vermandovillers German war cemetery =

- Interactive map of Vermandovillers German war cemetery

Details
- Established: 1920
- Location: Somme Département
- Country: France
- Owned by: German War Graves Commission
- No. of interments: 22,632

Vermandovillers German war cemetery contains remains of 22,632 soldiers who died in World War I. It is located in Somme Département, France and is cared for by the German War Graves Commission.

== History ==
The cemetery was created in 1920 by the French Army as a collective cemetery for German soldiers who died on the battle fields of the Somme. Apart from a few casualties from the fighting in the summer and autumn of 1914, those buried here were mainly killed in the Battle of the Somme in 1916, the Battle of Amiens, and the 1918 German spring offensive. Further remains were recovered in the first years after the war, while cleaning up the battlefields. Even to this day, when major earth movements reveal World War I-era bodies, the dead are re-interred here. The army units of those who rest in Vermandovillers derive from all countries and provinces of the former German Empire.

== Interwar period ==
Initial work on improving the condition of the cemetery arose through establishment of the German War-Care Association in 1927/28, through an agreement with French Army. Trees and shrubs were planted, the cemetery area was bordered with stone walls, and the common graves were marked with wild roses. However, the problem of establishing permanent grave markers remained unresolved due to currency inflation, the Great Depression and the outbreak of World War II.

== Final design ==
On completion of the Franco-German War Graves Agreement, the German War Graves Commission was charged with the final design of all German military cemeteries in France dating from the time of World War I.

Starting in 1964, National Association of North Rhine-Westphalia youth camp participants began leveling, soil improvement and replanting on the property, including new layouts for the graves. In 1979, permanent cast-metal markers with the names and dates of those at rest were installed to replace the temporary wooden markers. The Bundeswehr erected the concrete foundations for the metal crosses largely according to survey markings by participants in the National Association youth camps.

Of the 9,455 individual graves in this cemetery, those of 379 at rest remain unknown, while an additional 13,200 dead are interred in 15 mass graves. A famous literary figure rests in one of the mass graves; the Roman Catholic convert, war poet and Expressionist playwright Reinhard Johannes Sorge

In lieu of crosses, the graves of the 32 German Jewish soldiers were given stone markers whose Hebrew inscription reads in translation: "Here lies buried XXX. May his soul be woven into the circle of the living." The German Expressionist writer Alfred Lichtenstein, who fell fighting for the Kaiser in 1914, is by far the most famous of the 32 Jewish soldiers known to be buried at Vermandovilliers.

The mass graves are marked with heavy stone crosses and metal plaques affixed on the outer walls bearing the names of those who are known. A high forged-steel cross stands in the center of the cemetery.

There has been a fundamental review of landscaping, with grave area plantings, the establishment of new trees and shrubs, and overall maintenance of existing stock.
