= Volksbund =

In English usage, the German term Volksbund may refer to:

- German War Graves Commission, Volksbund Deutsche Kriegsgräberfürsorge
- The Volksbund of the Germans of Hungary, a National Socialist organization

== See also ==
- Volksbund on the German Wikipedia
