= Vermandovillers =

- Commune
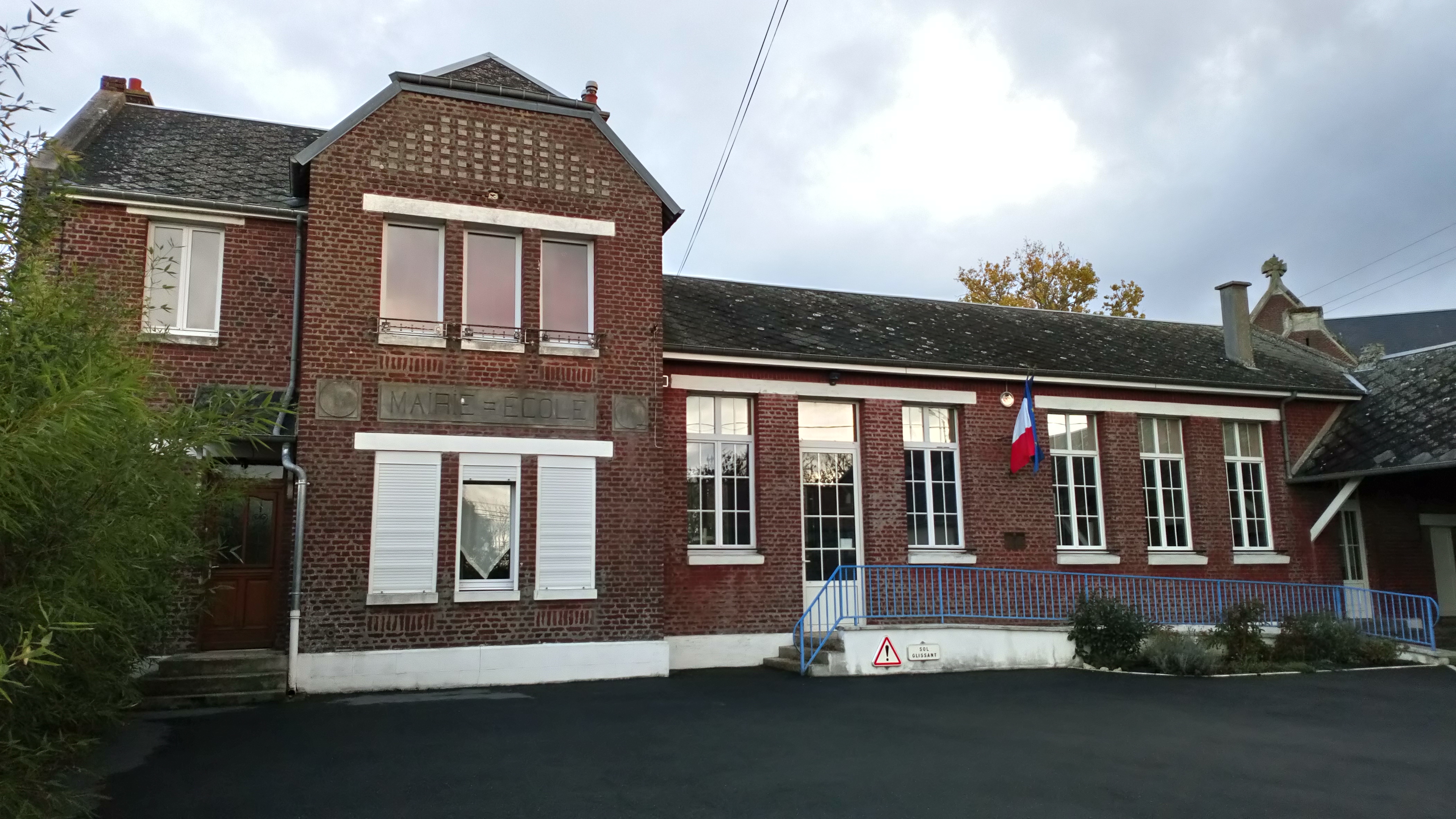
- Vermandovillers Town hall
- Location of Vermandovillers
- Location within France Location within Hauts-de-France
- Coordinates: 49°51′03″N 2°46′58″E
- Country: France
- Region: Hauts-de-France
- Department: Somme
- Arrondissement: Péronne
- Canton: Ham
- Intercommunality: CC Terre de Picardie

Government
  - Mayor (2020–2026): Christian Beaufils
- Area^{1}: 5.83 km^{2} (2.25 sq mi)
- Elevation: 82 m (269 ft)
- Highest elevation: 97 m (318 ft)
- Lowest elevation: 78 m (256 ft)
- Population (2023): 147
  - Density: 25.2/km^{2} (65.3/sq mi)
- Time zone: UTC+01:00 (CET)
  - Summer (DST): UTC+02:00 (CEST)
- INSEE/Postal code: 80789 /80320
- ^{1} French Land Register data, which excludes lakes, ponds, glaciers > 1 km^{2} (0.386 sq mi or 247 acres) and river estuaries.

Vermandovillers is a commune in the Somme department in Hauts-de-France in northern France.

== Geography ==
Vermandovillers is situated 26 miles (42 km) east of Amiens, on the D143 and D79 roads.

== History ==
=== World War I – Battles at Vermandovillers ===
The first attack occurred on September 24, 1914, it was partially blocked by the 75th Infantry Regiment at Etoilé woods near to Herleville.
The front was stabilized for two years until September 1916. The spearhead attack of September 4, 1916 at edge of Vermandovillers' Etoilé woods, was assigned to the 132nd Division(10th Army), against heavily concreted machine guns bunkers, organized by the Germans for nearly 2 years (Report No.: 6288/3 of September 26, 1916 of the 132nd Division). The position was defended by the 11th Division (German Empire), specifically the 21. Infanterie-Brigade and Infanterie-Regiment 51. On 6 September 1916, many (the 13th, the 43rd, the 51st and 120th) Infantry Regiments were involved in the so-called battle of Vermandovillers. It ended on September 9, 1916 for lack of troops. The 158th, the 366th Infantry Regiment and the 1st Battalion Chasseurs showed exemplary conduct and suffered heavy losses.

For the record, between September 4–9, 1916, the 86th Brigade lost 1,071 men, 264th Brigade lost 1,513 and 108th Brigade 1,580. These figures explain the fact that in a 5 kilometres (3 mi)radius around Vermandovillers, there are, buried in military cemeteries, including 1,261 French soldiers. 22,632 German soldiers lie in the Vermandovillers German war cemetery, including the writers Reinhard Johannes Sorge and Alfred Lichtenstein (writer). The British are not counted because although killed in the fighting, they are buried mainly at the Villers–Bretonneux Australian National Memorial.

== Population ==
Historical population
Year	Pop.	±% p.a.
1968	155	—
1975	138	−1.65%
1982	116	−2.45%
1990	116	+0.00%
1999	119	+0.28%
2007	111	−0.87%
2012	143	+5.20%
2017	150	+0.96%
2023	147	−0.34%
Source: INSEE

== See also ==
- Communes of the Somme department
