= Alfred Lichtenstein =

Alfred Lichtenstein may refer to:

- Alfred Lichtenstein (philatelist) (1876-1947), American philatelist
- Alfred Lichtenstein (writer) (1889-1914), German writer
