= Orglandes German war cemetery =

Cemetery in France

- German War Graves Commission (Volksbund Deutsche Kriegsgräberfürsorge)
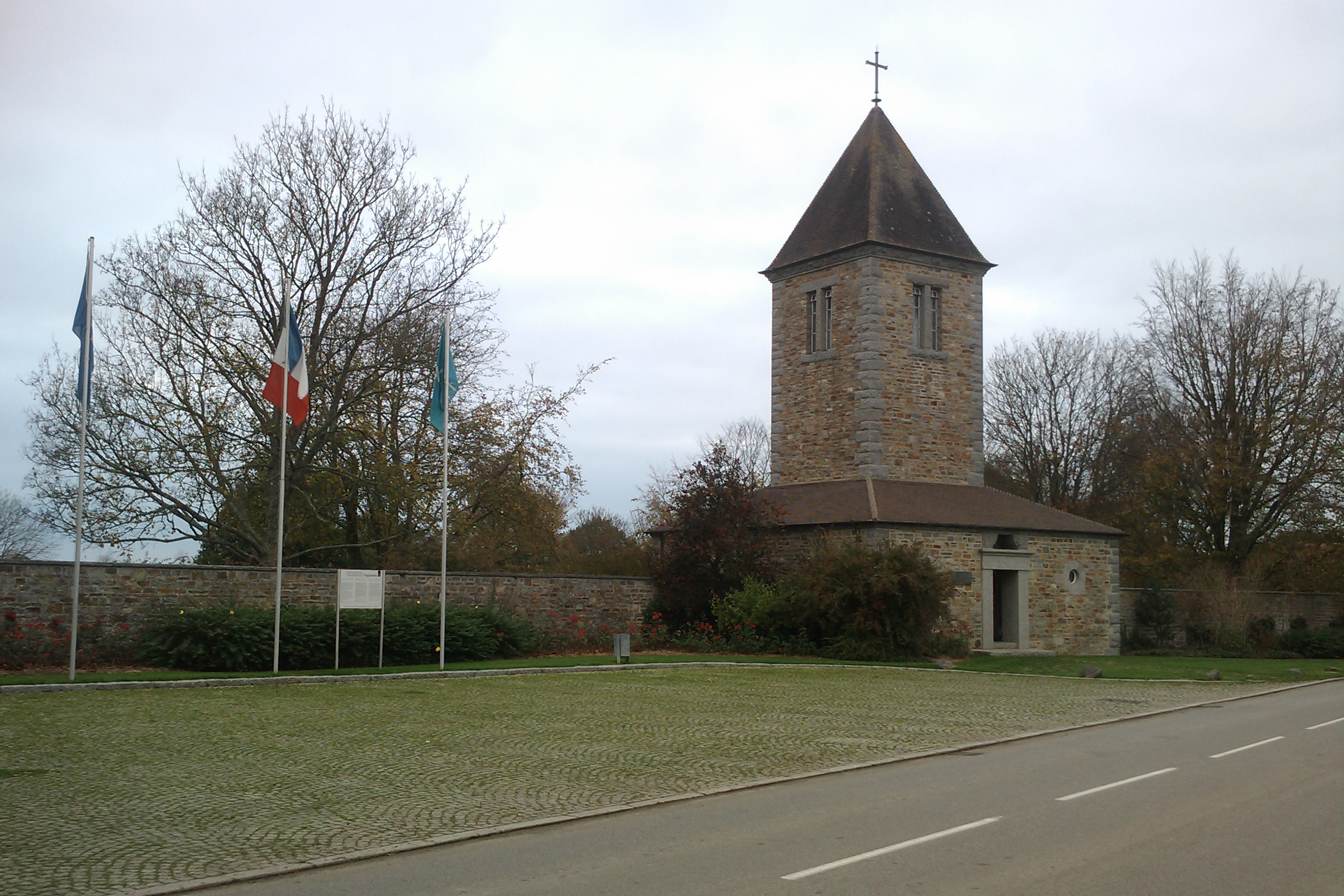
- Entrance to the cemetery
- Used for those deceased 1944
- Established: 1944 (Inaugurated 1961)
- Location: 49°25′35″N 1°26′58″W near Orglandes, Manche
- Total burials: 10,152

Burials by nation
- Germany

Burials by war
- World War II

Orglandes War Cemetery is a German World War II cemetery in Normandy, France. It is located on the northern edge of the village of Orglandes, about 30 km (19 mi) south east of Cherbourg and 7 km (4.3 mi) west of Sainte-Mère-Église on the Cotentin Peninsula. The burials come from summer 1944, immediately following D-Day and the Battle of Normandy. It is the second smallest of the six German war cemeteries in Normandy with a little over 10,000 burials. The cemetery is maintained and managed by the voluntary German War Graves Commission (Volksbund Deutsche Kriegsgräberfürsorge).

== Formation ==
Created during the Battle of Normandy on 20 June 1944, the cemetery was formed by the 603rd Quartermaster Graves Registration Company for the burial of fallen 1st US Army service personnel. Initially one field containing American war dead was created followed by another for German casualties. At the war's end over 7,300 German soldiers were interred at the cemetery. The American Battle Monuments Commission began exhuming the remains of American servicemen after the war and transferred them in accordance with the wishes of their families. Beginning in 1945, the Americans moved two-thirds of their fallen from this site back to the United States while the remainder were re-interred at the new permanent American Cemetery and Memorial at Colleville-sur-Mer, which overlooks the Omaha Beach landing beach. The burial plots of the Americans were reused by to inter German war dead from 1,400 locations across the Normandy region by the French authorities (Service Francais des Sepultures).

In 1954, the Franco-German War Graves Agreement ratified that the Reinterment Commission of the Volksbund could move German bodies from field graves and village cemeteries. During the removals many previously unknown German soldiers were identified. Between 1958 and 1961, Orglandes was redeveloped by the German War Graves Commission. Over time, further German war dead were interred at the cemetery from their original field burials. There are now 10,152 graves at the site, arranged in 28 rows, each marked with a stone cross. Headstones are double-sided with the majority marking multiple interments.

== Layout ==
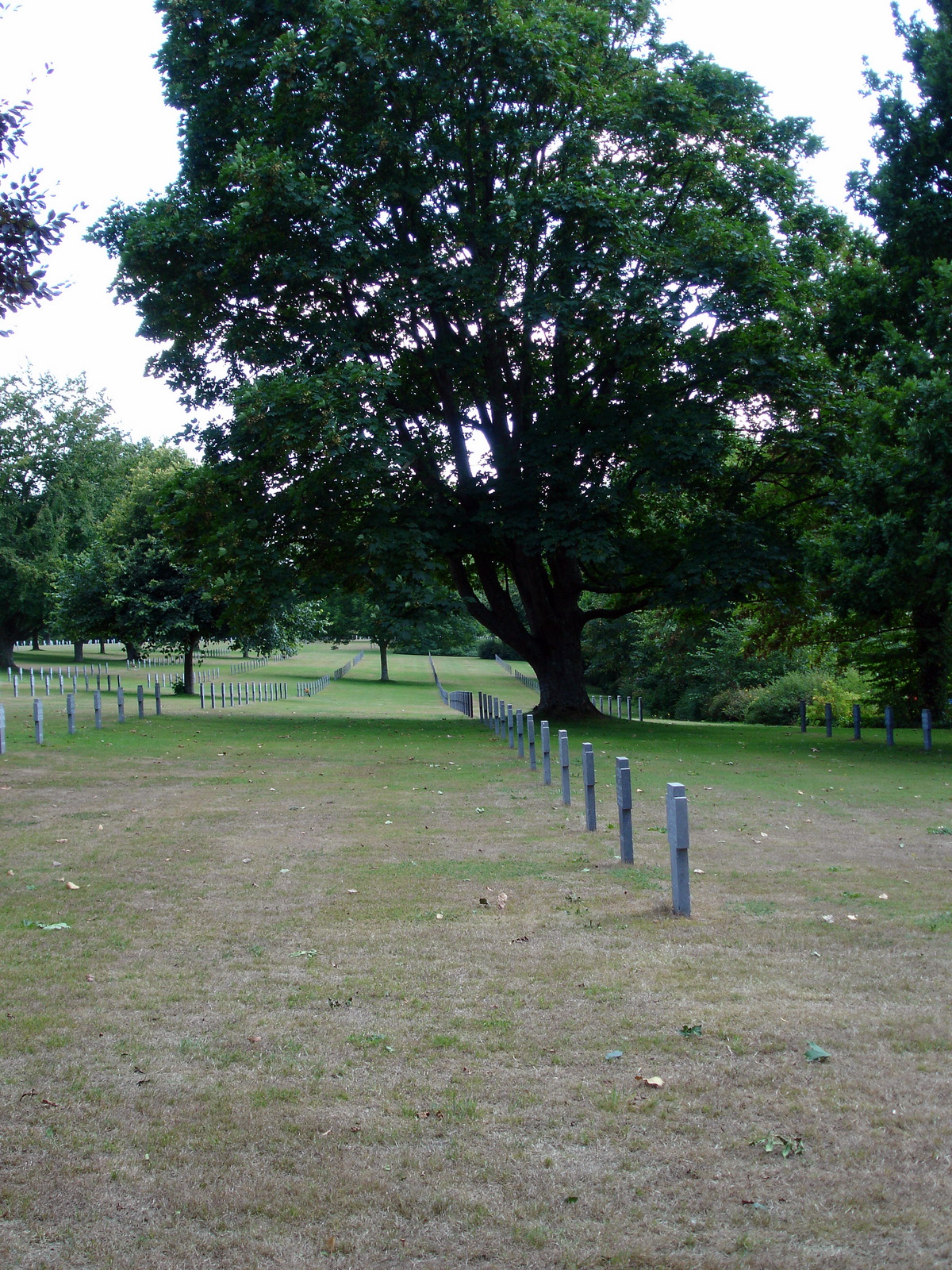
The German military cemetery on northern side of Orglandes

The entrance is marked by a small house surmounted by a bell tower. The cemetery consists of 28 rows of graves, each grave marked by a stone cross. Each cross details the name and date of birth and death of each of the six or more dead soldiers buried to each cross.

Once the neck of the Cotentin Peninsula had been crossed, the American forces then headed towards Valogne and Cherbourg.The soldiers who fell during these operations were originally buried here in the village of Orglandes. After 1945, only the German war dead, 7358 in all, remained: the Americans were re-interred in Saint-Laurent-sur-Mer. The French Burial Department brought together all the scattered German war dead in the surrounding area, some of whom had been buried alone, others in small cemeteries, and reburied them in the vacated ground. The total number of German war dead lying here comes to 10,152.

The cemetery is administered and maintained by the German War Graves Commission (Volksbund Deutsche Kriegsgräberfürsorge). The landscaping was completed in 1958 and the cemetery was inaugurated on September 20, 1961.

== Post war casualties ==
A single mass grave contains the remains of 22 German prisoners of war who died on 25 October 1945. It is thought the men were members of a mine clearance team that were killed by the accidental explosion of demolition charges in Asnières-en-Bessin close to Bayeux. The devastating explosion means the men's remains were interred together.

== Liberation plaque ==
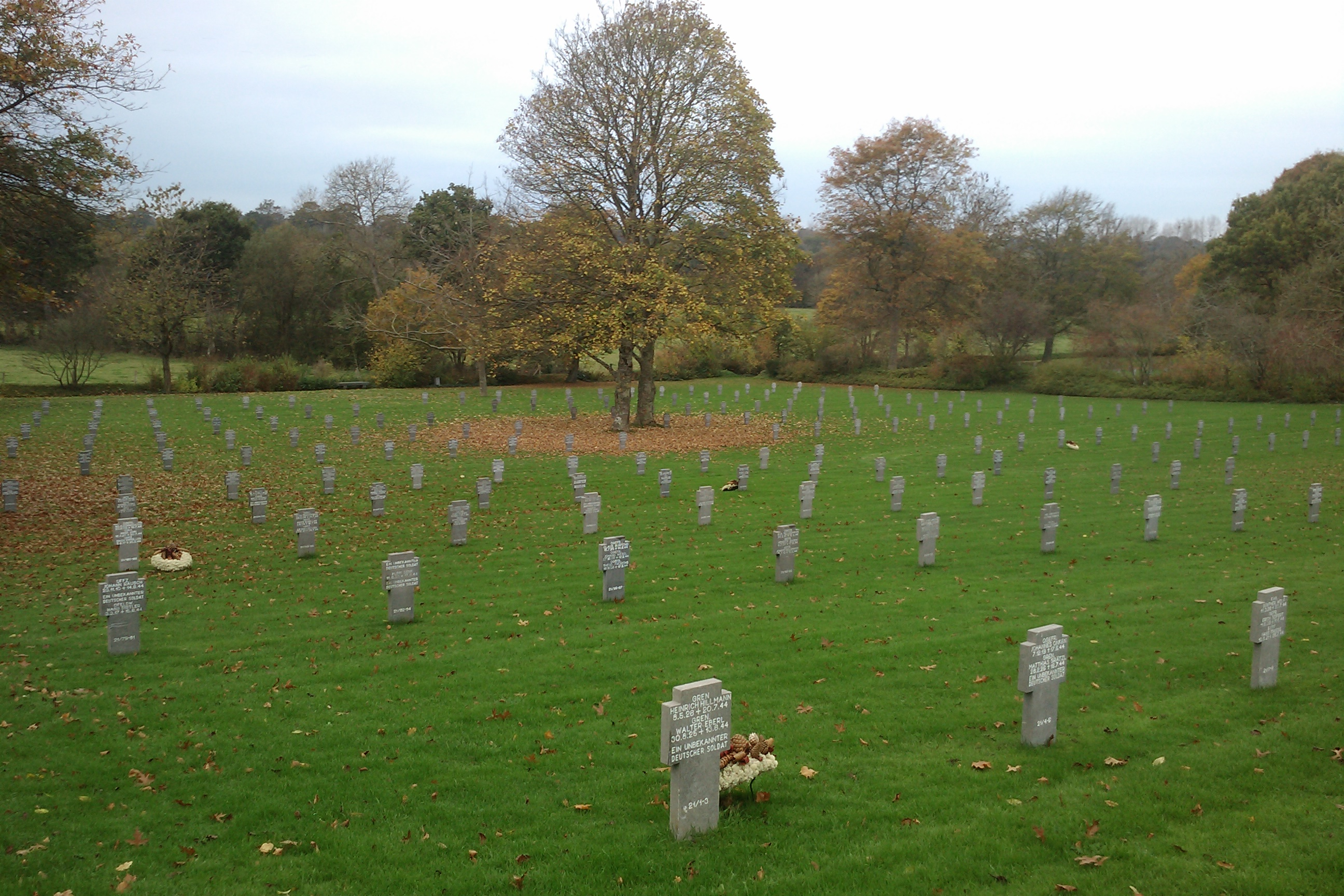
Six or more dead soldiers buried to each cross, three on each side

By the entrance is a small plaque which says:

In honour of the 9th and 90th United States Infantry Divisions who liberated Orglandes on 17 June 1944.

== See also ==
- List of military cemeteries in Normandy
