= Fricourt German war cemetery =

Cemetery in Somme, France

- German War Graves Commission (Volksbund Deutsche Kriegsgräberfürsorge)
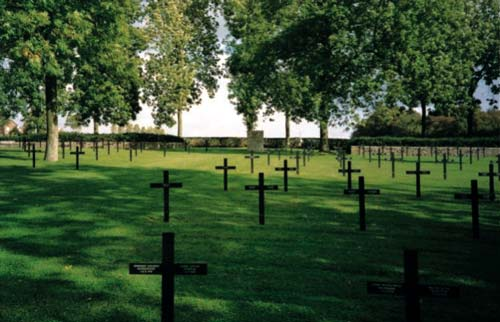
- Fricourt German war cemetery
- Used for those deceased Sep 1914 - Oct 1918
- Established: Concentration cemetery. 1920 onwards
- Location: 50°0′16″N 2°42′55″E near Albert, Somme, France
- Total burials: 17,027
- Unknowns: 6,477

Burials by nation
- German Empire

Burials by war
- World War I

Fricourt German war cemetery is near the village of Fricourt, near Albert, in the French département of the Somme. Most of the fallen were members of the Imperial German 2nd Army. Of the 17,000 burials, about 1,000 died in the autumn of 1914 and the ensuing trench warfare; about 10,000 during the Battle of the Somme (July–November 1916); and the final 6,000 in the German spring offensive of 1918 and the ensuing Allied counter-attack, the Hundred Days Offensive.

== History ==
The cemetery was established by the French military authorities in 1920 and concentrates burials from "some 79 communes in the regions around Bapaume, Albert, Combles, the Ancre valley and Villers-Bretonneux". About 5,000 of the burials are mostly in shared double graves; the remainder lie in four communal graves.

Among those buried at one time in Fricourt was the iconic flying ace Manfred von Richthofen, alias, "The Red Baron", who was killed in action on 21 April 1918 by machine gun fire either from the Sopwith Camel of Canadian Royal Flying Corps pilot Arthur Roy Brown or from an Australian Imperial Force soldier firing on the ground. The remains of Squadron Commander von Richthofen were buried with full military honours by the Australian Imperial Force. Later his remains were transferred first to Fricourt, then to the Invalidenfriedhof Cemetery in Berlin, and now rest in a family plot at Wiesbaden.

In 1929, the German War Graves Commission started working on the German military grave registration service and landscaping the cemetery. It received a new entrance with stairs and wrought-iron gate and trees and bushes were planted. The community graves got a verge made of natural stone and a planting with game roses. A wooden high cross served as a central mark; however a problem remained of a durable and long term marking for the graves. In 1939, the eruption of the Second World War saw a suspension of the Commission's work.

After the conclusion of the French-German war grave agreement, from 19 July 1966 the German War Graves Commission could begin German military grave registration service with the final organization of the German military cemeteries in France dating from the First World War. Starting from 1977, the provisional wood grave markers were exchanged with those made of metal with raised names and dates, where possible. The Bundeswehr took over the construction of the concrete foundations necessary for setting up the metal crosses, which were shifted mostly by participants in youth camps.

== Architecture ==
Some 5,057 soldiers are buried in single graves, with 114 remaining unknown. Four communal graves contain 11,970 burials. There are also 14 graves for Jewish soldiers, marked with a headstone instead of a cross. The Hebrew characters mean "XXX rests buried" and "their soul may be enwoven into the circle of the living persons."

From the late 1960s to the early 1970s a fundamental change in the landscape gardening took place, which extended to the renewal of the hedge and the bricked edge of the community graves. New trees and shrubs were planted and the existing wooden high cross was replaced with one of forged steel.

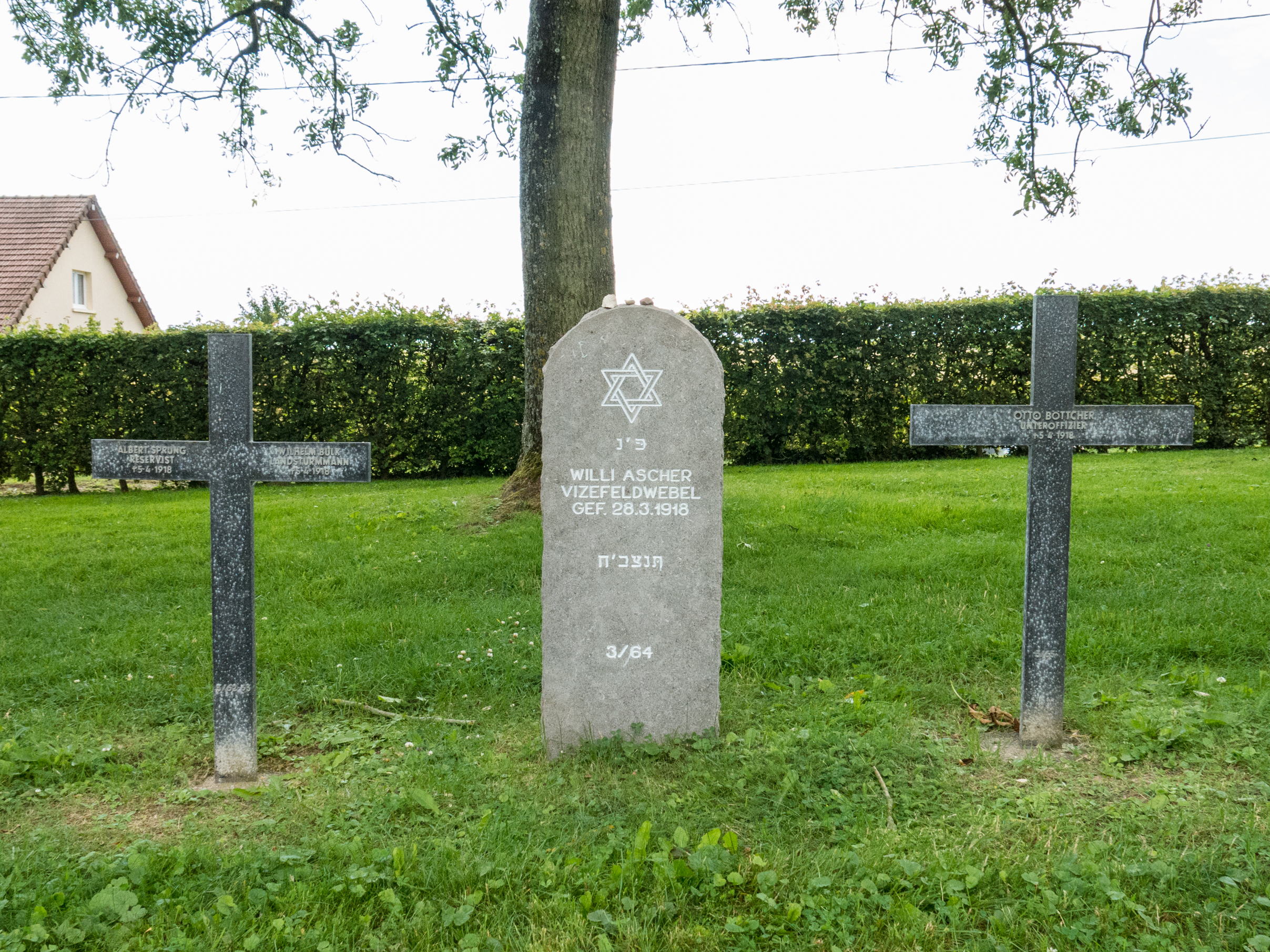
Gravestone for Jewish soldier

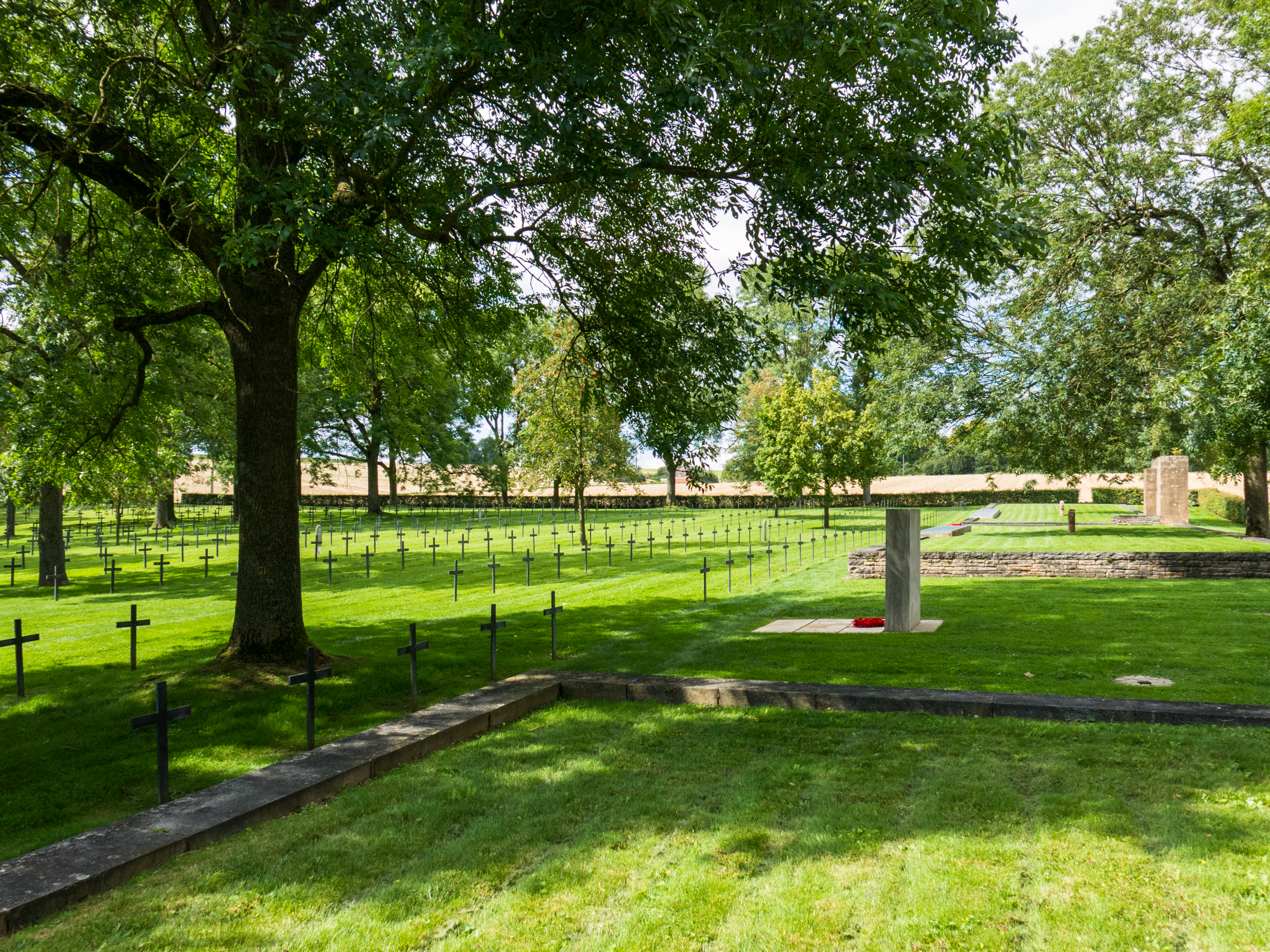
Individual and community graves

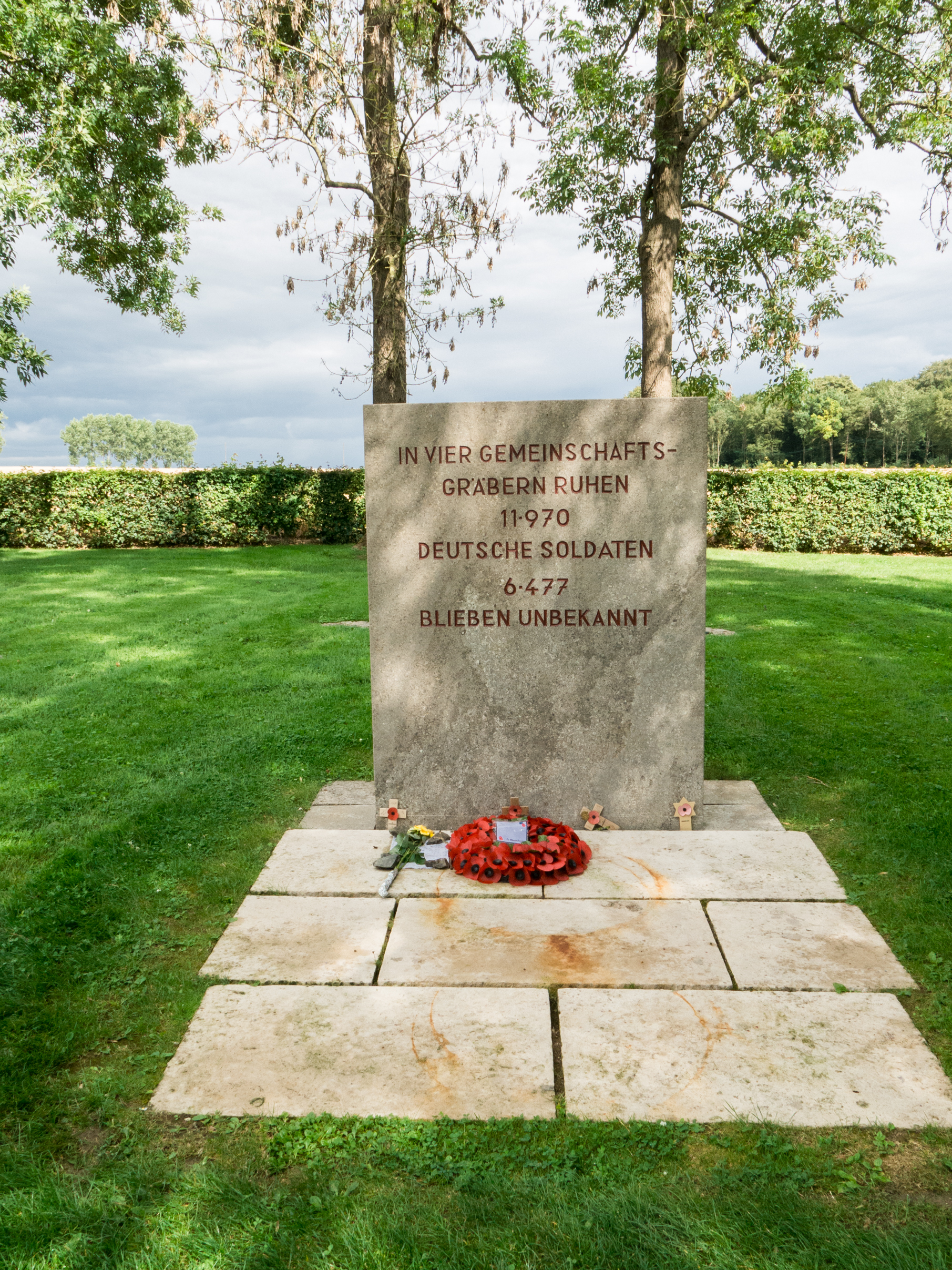
Community graves

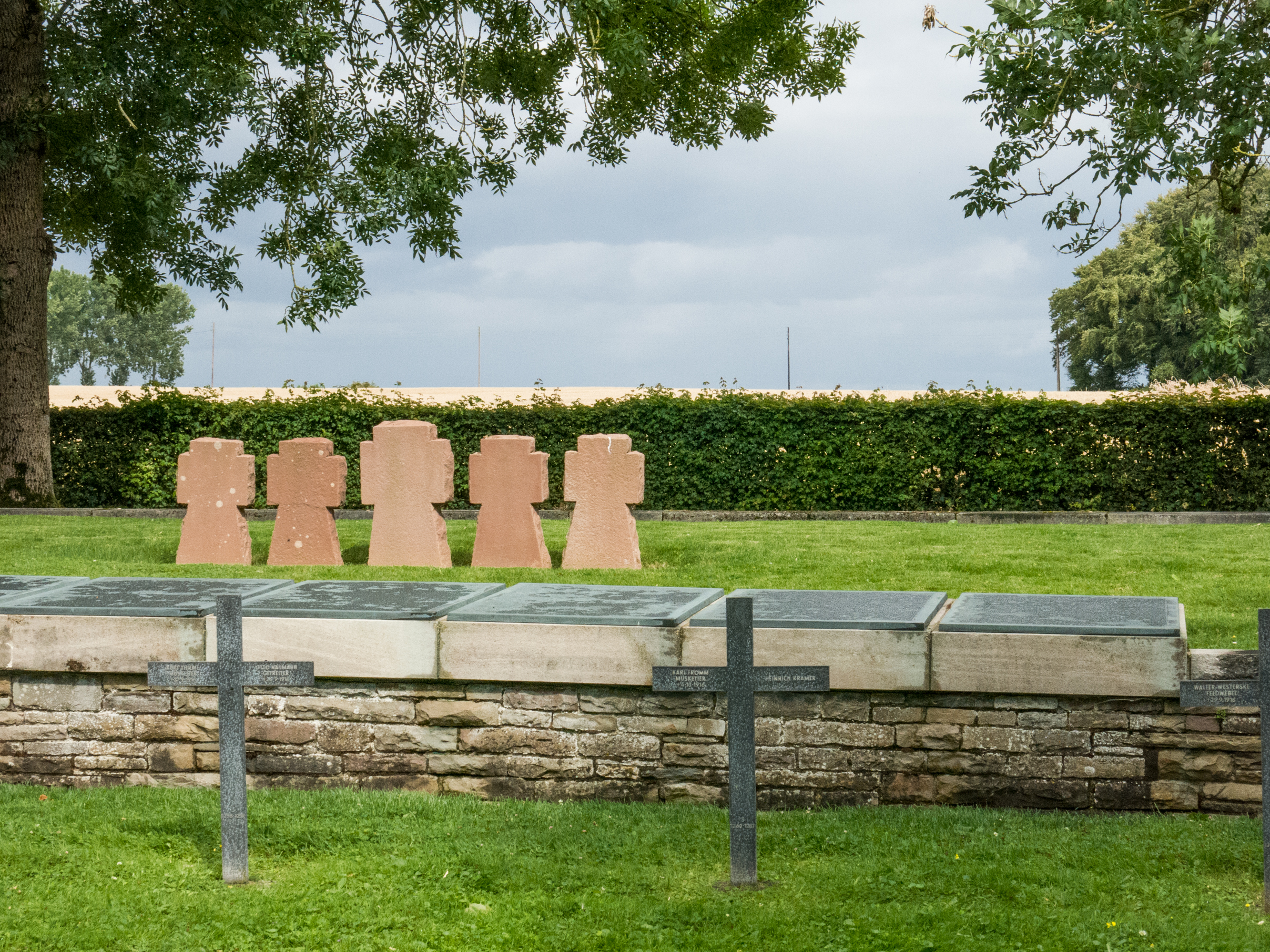
Plaques with the names of identified soldiers killed in action in the community graves (in front of the stone crosses)

== See also ==
There are two British military cemeteries (CWGC) of World War I at the outskirts of Fricourt.

- Fricourt New Military Cemetery in the west of Fricourt
- Fricourt British Cemetery (Bray Road) in the southwest of Fricourt
