= Rovaniemi German Military Cemetery =

German cemetery in Finland

Coordinates: 66°37′40″N 25°47′08″E

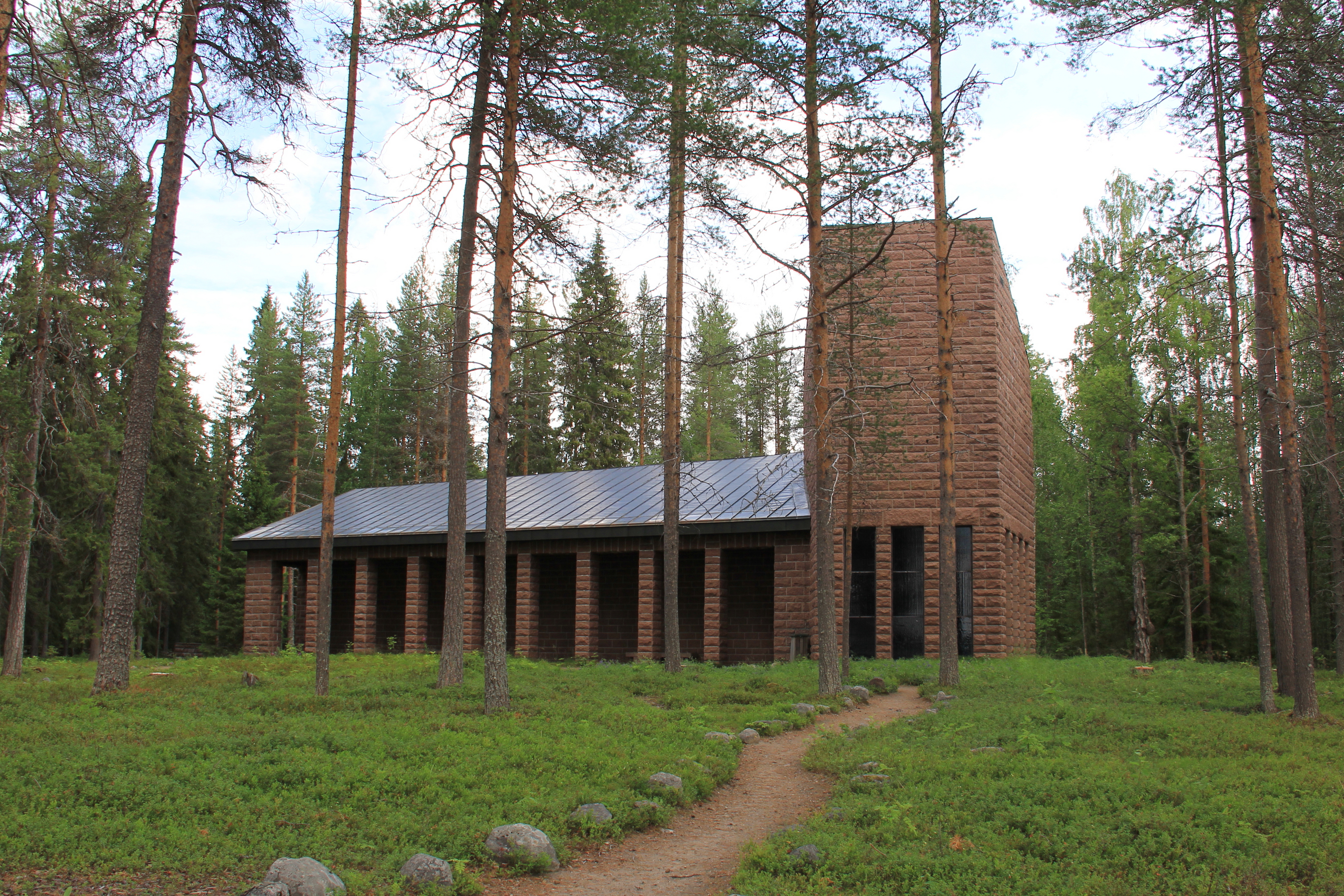
Main entrance

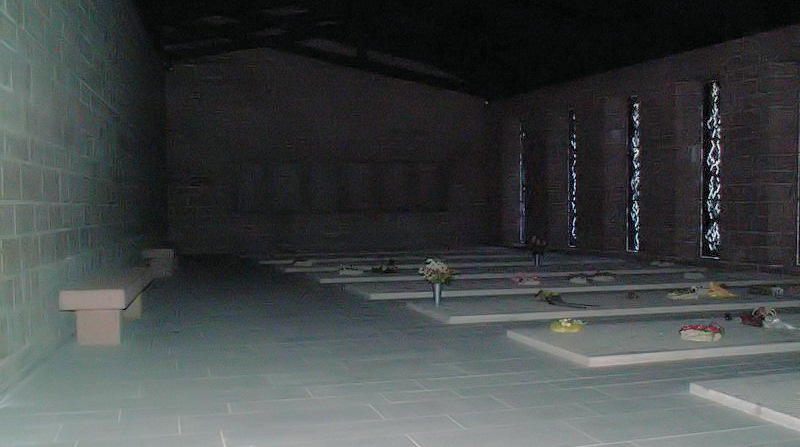
Interior limestone tombs

The German Military Cemetery (Finnish: Saksalaisten sotilaiden hautausmaa, German: Deutscher Soldatenfriedhof) of Rovaniemi is located on lake Norvajärvi, in Finnish Lapland. It is the final resting place of 2,530 German soldiers who died in the Finnish regions of Lapland and Oulu during World War II. It was inaugurated on August 31, 1963 and is managed by the German War Graves Commission. The red granite structure houses a mausoleum as well as a bronze interpretation of the Pieta, depicting a mother holding her fallen son.
