= Rossoschka German War Cemetery =

World War II cemetery in Volgograd, Russia

Coordinates: 48°49′27″N 44°09′53″E

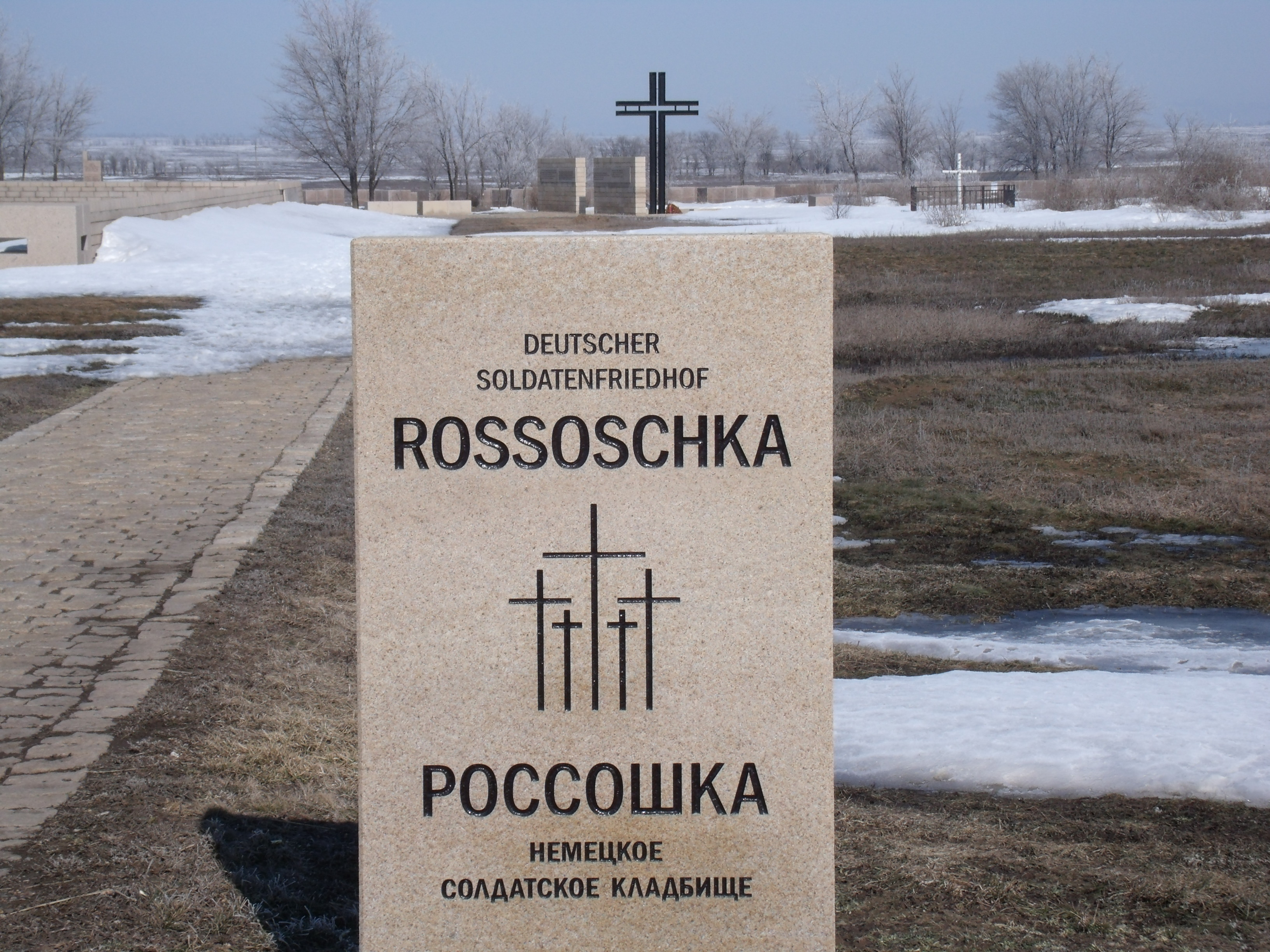

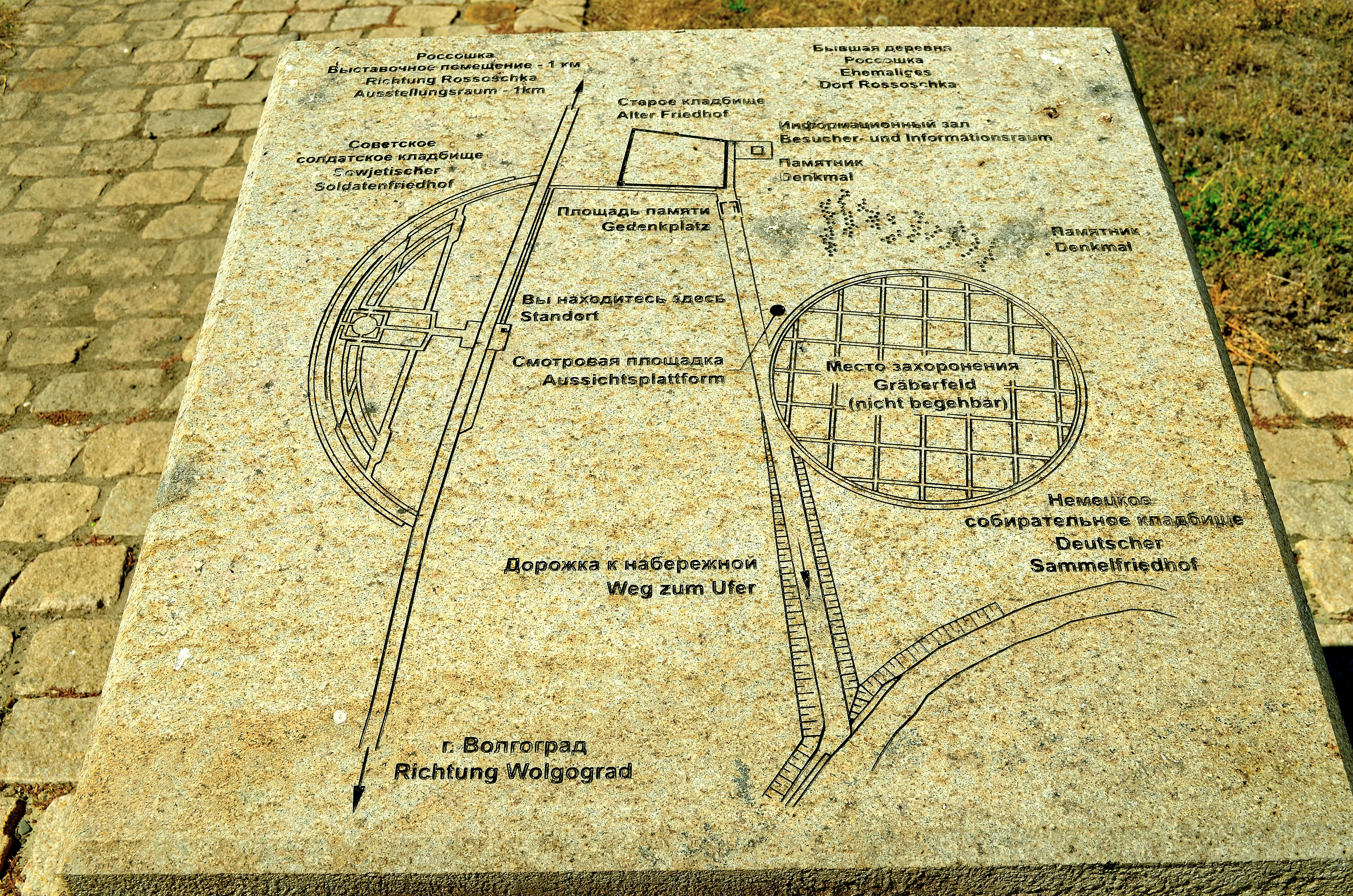
Map of the Rossoschka German War Cemetery

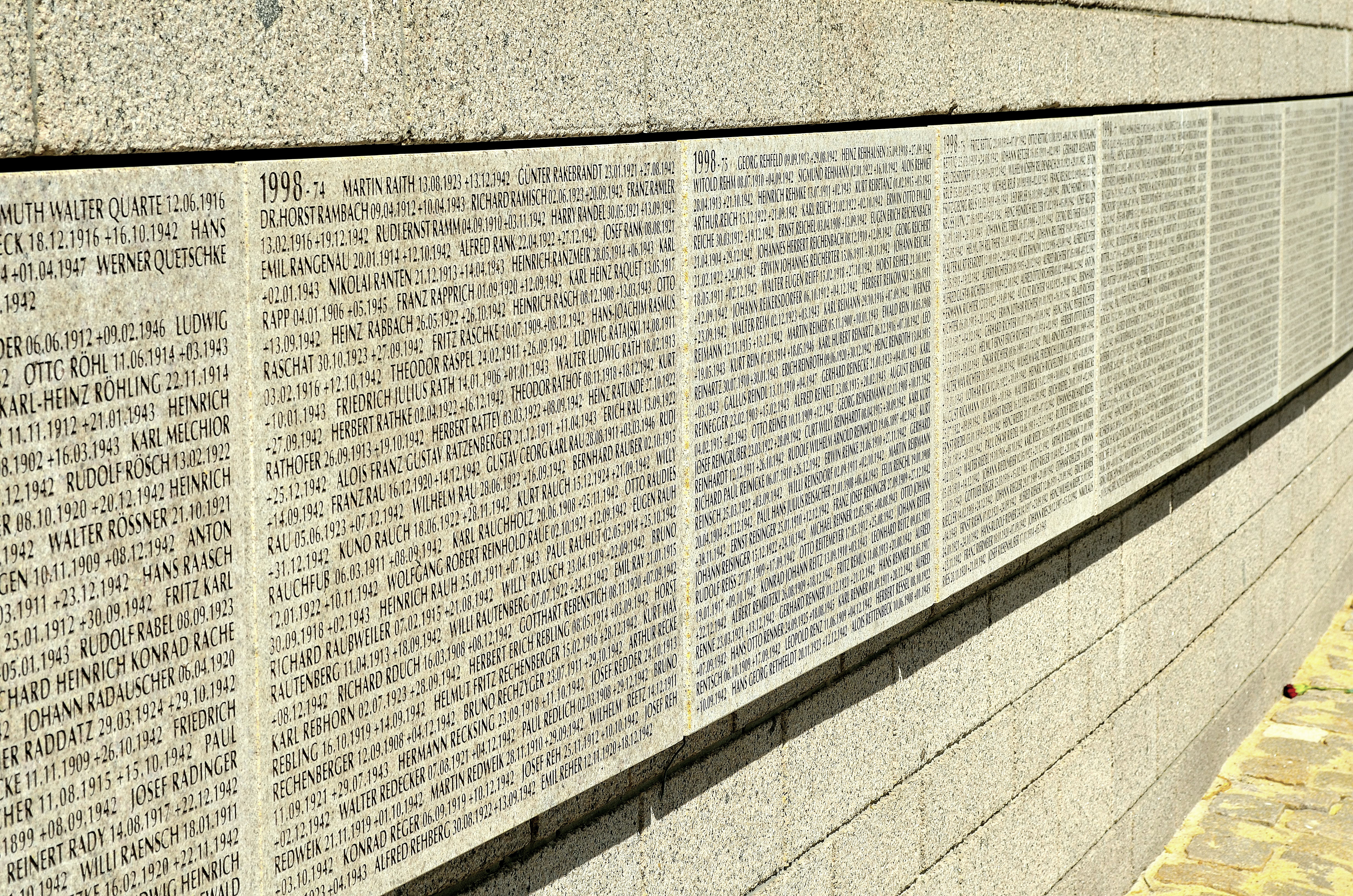

The Rossoschka German War Cemetery is located 37 kilometers northwest of the city center of Volgograd on the Rossoschka River in Russia. It is a resting place and a place of remembrance for those who died in the Battle of Stalingrad and for those missing whose bodies could not be recovered. The Rossoshka Soviet War Cemetery is also located nearby and contains Russian burials from the same battle.

65,000 German soldiers are reported to be buried at Rossoschka, and in September 2019, 1,837 more soldiers were laid to rest there, these soldiers remains had been discovered in a mass grave in Stalingrad a year earlier (25 September 2018) while moving a water pipeline.

The cemetery is maintained by the German War Graves Commission.
