= Fricourt =

- Commune
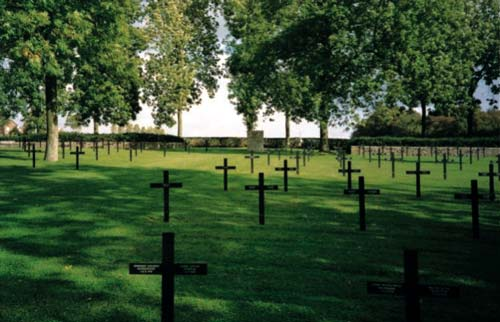
- German war cemetery

- Coat of arms
- Location of Fricourt
- Location within France Location within Hauts-de-France
- Coordinates: 49°59′56″N 2°42′57″E
- Country: France
- Region: Hauts-de-France
- Department: Somme
- Arrondissement: Péronne
- Canton: Albert
- Intercommunality: Pays du Coquelicot

Government
  - Mayor (2020–2026): Myriam Demailly
- Area^{1}: 11.3 km^{2} (4.4 sq mi)
- Elevation: 65 m (213 ft)
- Highest elevation: 134 m (440 ft)
- Lowest elevation: 54 m (177 ft)
- Population (2023): 457
  - Density: 40.4/km^{2} (105/sq mi)
- Time zone: UTC+01:00 (CET)
  - Summer (DST): UTC+02:00 (CEST)
- INSEE/Postal code: 80366 /80300
- ^{1} French Land Register data, which excludes lakes, ponds, glaciers > 1 km^{2} (0.386 sq mi or 247 acres) and river estuaries.

Fricourt (French pronunciation: [fʁikuʁ]) is a commune in the Somme department in Hauts-de-France in northern France.

== Geography ==
Fricourt is situated on the D147 and D64 junction, some 20 miles (32 km) northeast of Amiens.

== History ==
Fricourt is about a kilometre from Mametz. It was close to the front line for much of World War I and saw particularly fierce fighting during the 1916, first 1918 and second 1918 Battles of the Somme and the first, second and third Battles of Albert. Fricourt is also one of the sites where large mines were exploded on the first day of the Battle of the Somme.

== Population ==
Historical population
Year	Pop.	±% p.a.
1968	471	—
1975	477	+0.18%
1982	502	+0.73%
1990	466	−0.93%
1999	448	−0.44%
2007	498	+1.33%
2012	494	−0.16%
2017	490	−0.16%
2023	457	−1.16%
Source: INSEE

== See also ==
- Capture of Fricourt
- Fricourt German war cemetery
- Communes of the Somme department
