= Marigny German war cemetery =

WWII cemetery in Manche, France

- German War Graves Commission (Volksbund Deutsche Kriegsgräberfürsorge)
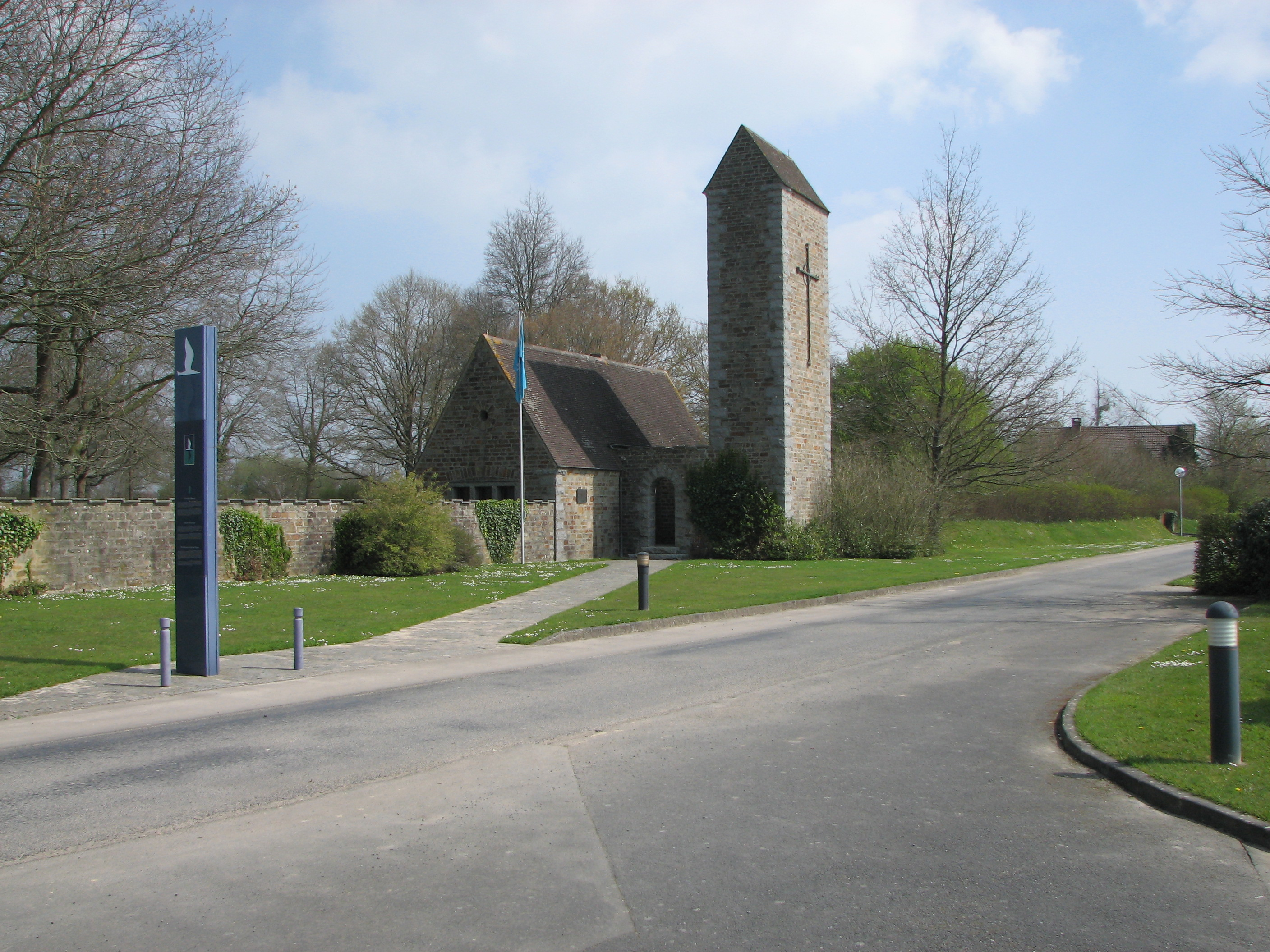
- The German military cemetery in Marigny
- Used for those deceased 1944
- Established: 1944 (Finished 1961)
- Location: 49°06′49″N 1°14′09″W near Saint-Lô, Calvados, France
- Total burials: 11,169

Burials by nation
- Germany

Burials by war
- World War II

Marigny German war cemetery is a German World War II cemetery in Normandy, France. It is located 12 km (7.5 mi) west of Saint-Lô. The cemetery contains in excess of 11,000 German military personnel and is maintained and managed by the German War Graves Commission (Volksbund Deutsche Kriegsgräberfürsorge).

== History ==
Marigny was originally the site of a battlefield cemetery, established by the United States Army Graves Registration Service during the war, where American and German soldiers, sailors and airmen were buried in two adjacent fields.

In 1945 and 1946 the American war dead were relocated in 3,070 graves to the cemetery in St. Laurent-sur-Mer. In 1957 the Reburial Service of the German War Graves Commission interred German soldiers from numerous small graveyards and field graves at Marigny. The graveyard was created as five long blocks of graves with a banked outer boundary. Ceramics plaques bear the name, rank, and dates of birth and death of two soldiers. The cemetery contains a total of 11,169 graves.

In 1958 the buildings and gardens were created by the German War Graves Commission. The main entrance to the graveyard was built in the style of a Norman village church. The cemetery is now surrounded by a stone wall. The cemetery was inaugurated on September 20, 1961.

== Personal fates ==
The majority of the fallen in the graveyard date from the American advance during Operation Cobra in the summer of 1944.

== Volunteer maintenance ==
Unlike the American and Commonwealth War Graves Commissions, the German Commission is entirely voluntary and relies on gifts and collections to further its work. During the summer months school children visit the area to tend the graves. They volunteer to work with the Volksbund during their school holidays and visit American and German war cemeteries, memorials, sites of the invasion and take part in the memorial ceremony with veterans.

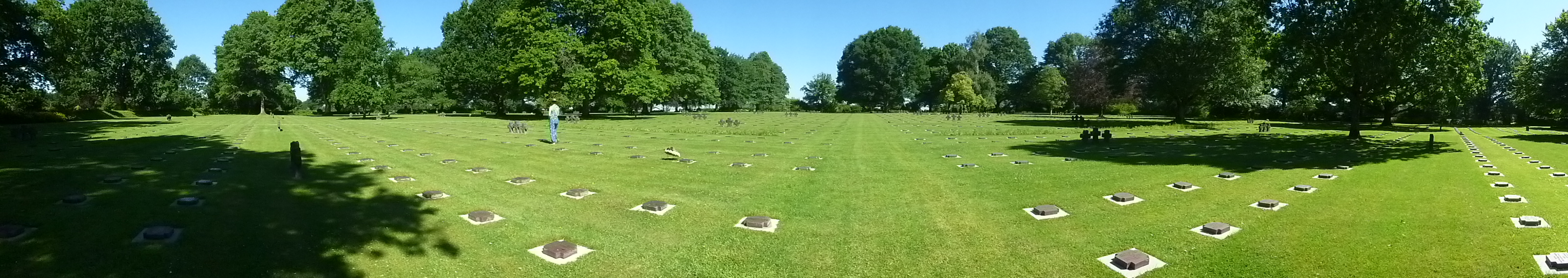
Panoramic photograph of Marigny German war cemetery.

== See also ==
- List of military cemeteries in Normandy
