= Orglandes =

- Commune
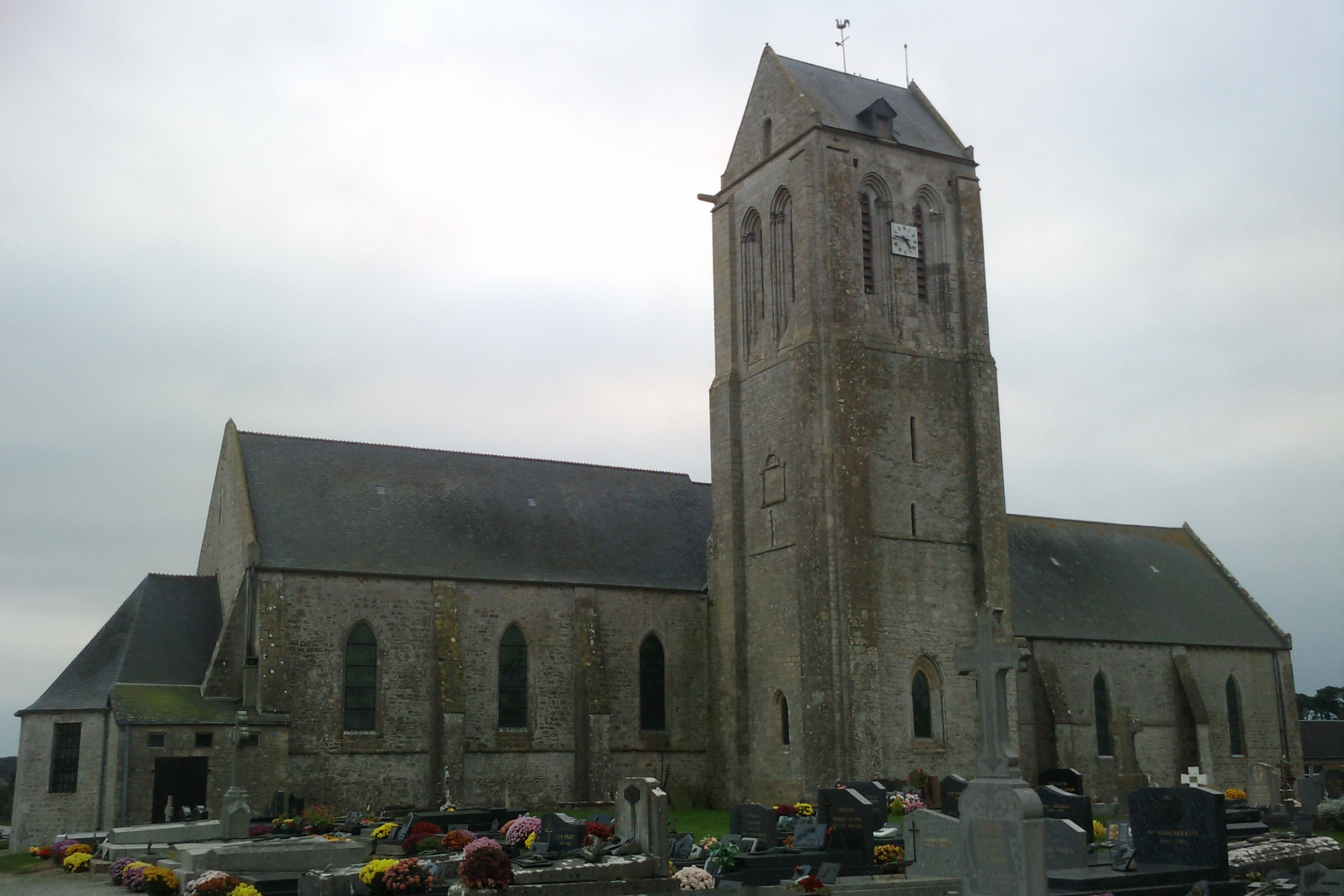
- Notre-Dame d'Orglandes

- Coat of arms
- Location of Orglandes
- Location within France Location within Normandy
- Coordinates: 49°25′21″N 1°26′53″W
- Country: France
- Region: Normandy
- Department: Manche
- Arrondissement: Cherbourg
- Canton: Bricquebec-en-Cotentin
- Intercommunality: CA Cotentin

Government
  - Mayor (2020–2026): François Lefauconnier
- Area^{1}: 9.26 km^{2} (3.58 sq mi)
- Elevation: 30 m (98 ft)
- Highest elevation: 38 m (125 ft)
- Lowest elevation: 5 m (16 ft)
- Population (2023): 346
  - Density: 37.4/km^{2} (96.8/sq mi)
- Time zone: UTC+01:00 (CET)
  - Summer (DST): UTC+02:00 (CEST)
- INSEE/Postal code: 50387 /50390
- ^{1} French Land Register data, which excludes lakes, ponds, glaciers > 1 km^{2} (0.386 sq mi or 247 acres) and river estuaries.

Orglandes (French pronunciation: [ɔʁɡlɑ̃d]) is a commune in the Manche department in Normandy in north-western France.

== See also ==
- Communes of the Manche department
