= Glencree German war cemetery =

Cemetery in Ireland

Coordinates: 53.20080°N 6.29236°W

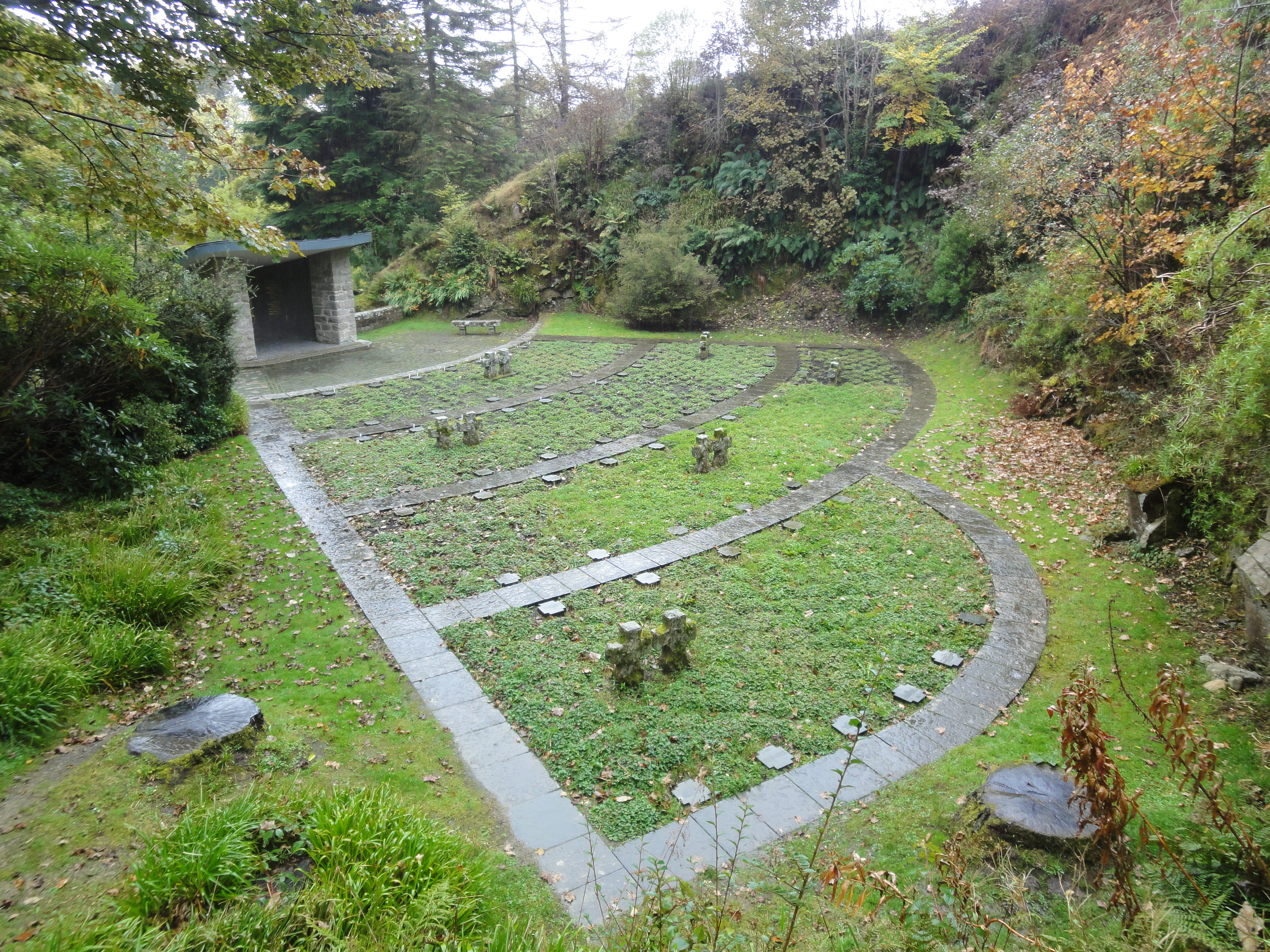
Glencree German war cemetery

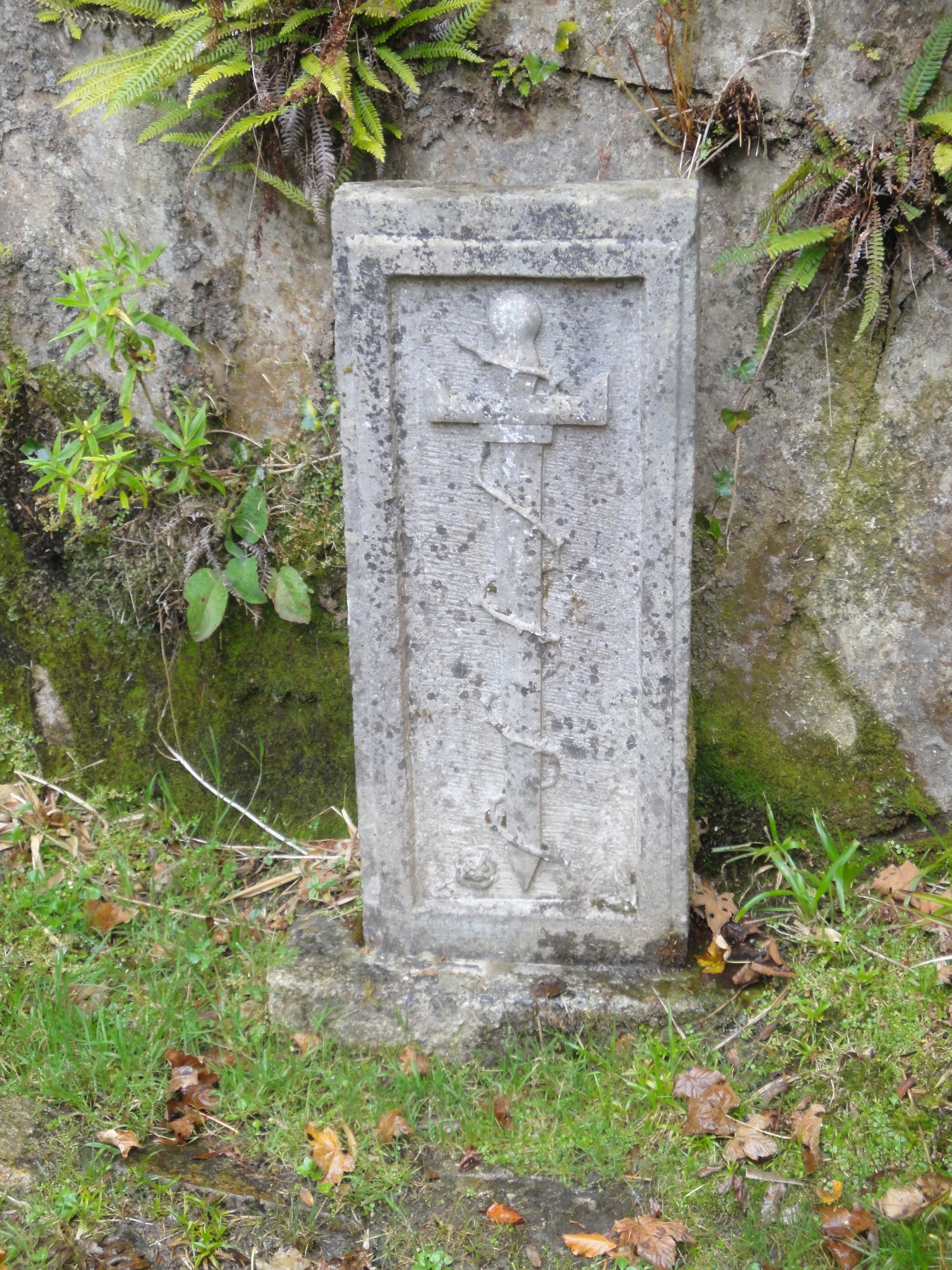
Glencree German war cemetery

The Glencree German War Cemetery (German: Deutscher Soldatenfriedhof Glencree) is located in the valley of Glencree, County Wicklow, Ireland.

The cemetery was dedicated on 9 July 1961. There are 134 graves. Most are Luftwaffe (air force) or Kriegsmarine (navy) personnel. Fifty-three are identified, 28 are unknown. Six bodies are those of World War I prisoners of war held by the British. Forty-six were German civilian detainees who were being shipped from Britain to Canada for internment when their ship, SS Arandora Star was torpedoed by a German U-boat, U-47, off Tory Island, County Donegal, in July 1940. Dr Hermann Görtz, an Abwehr spy, is also buried there. Dr Görtz committed suicide after the war when he was informed he would be deported; he feared he would be handed over to the Soviet Union.

The graveyard is administered by the German War Graves Commission (Volksbund Deutsche Kriegsgräberfürsorge).

Alongside the German Cemetery, on the bank of the Glencree River, a Mass rock can be reached by a narrow riverside path.
