= German War Graves Commission =

Organisation responsible for the maintenance and upkeep of German war graves

People's Alliance of the German War Graves Care
- Volksbund Deutsche Kriegsgräberfürsorge
- Logo
- Abbreviation: VDK
- Formation: 16 December 1919
- Legal status: Association (e. V.)
- Purpose: To locate, maintain, care for German war graves outside of Germany
- Headquarters: Kassel, Hesse, Germany
- Region served: Europe and North Africa (46 countries)
- Members: 82,030 (2019)
- Official language: German
- President: Wolfgang Schneiderhan
- Main organ: Until 2012: Stimme & Weg, from 2013 on: frieden
- Budget: EUR 51,784,000 (2019)
- Staff: 556 (2019)
- Volunteers: 8,000 (2013)
- Website: volksbund.de

The People's Alliance of the German War Graves Care (German: Volksbund Deutsche Kriegsgräberfürsorge, pronounced [ˈfɔlksbʊnt ˈdɔʏtʃə ˈkʁiːksɡʁɛːbɐˌfyːɐ̯zɔʁɡə]) is responsible for the maintenance and upkeep of German war graves in Europe and North Africa. Its objectives are acquisition, maintenance and care of German war graves; tending to next of kin; youth and educational work; and preservation of the memory to the sacrifices of war and despotism. Former head of the Bundeswehr Wolfgang Schneiderhan was elected President of the organisation in 2016, succeeding SPD politician Markus Meckel. The President of Germany, currently Frank-Walter Steinmeier (SPD), is the organisation's patron.

== Role ==
The People's Alliance of the German War Graves Care cares for the graves, at 832 cemeteries in 46 countries, of more than 2.7 million persons killed during World War I and World War II. The German war graves are intended to remember all groups of war dead: military personnel, those dead by aerial warfare, murdered in the Holocaust, and all other persons persecuted to death. In addition, the Volksbund maintains cemeteries and memorials of the Franco-Prussian War, First Schleswig War, Second Schleswig War, and the German colonial era.

== History ==
=== Establishment ===
The commission was founded as a private charity on 16 December 1919, as the recognised [German] People's Alliance under the war graves provisions of Article 225 of the Treaty of Versailles. By the 1930s, the commission had established numerous cemeteries for German World War I dead.

=== World War II and postwar ===
During World War II, the work of the People's Alliance was mostly carried out by the Wehrmacht's own graves service. After World War II, the People's Alliance resumed its work in 1946 and soon established more than 400 war cemeteries in Germany. In 1954, the German chancellor Konrad Adenauer, tasked the People's Alliance with the establishment, care and upkeep of German war cemeteries abroad.

== Philosophy ==
To guard the memory of the victims of war and violence, to work for peace among all nations and to guarantee dignity of men, are the main goals in the statutes of the People's Alliance of the German War Graves Care. All its activities must harmonize with these general principles.

== Organisation ==
=== Financing ===
The People's Alliance spent about €52 million in 2019. Half of it was used for maintenance of the cemeteries, more than a third to remind what happened and to learn from it, the rest was used to keep the association running. Two-thirds of this sum was financed by members and private donations. One-third was paid by government (war graves outside of Germany) and states (maintenance of some war graves within Germany).

== Activities ==
=== Casualties, war graves, prisoner of war graves ===
The People's Alliance looks after "832 military cemeteries in 46 countries with about 2.75 million dead" and its work is carried out today by 8,000 honorary and 556 full-time employees. Since the end of the Cold War, the Volksbund has access to Eastern Europe, where most World War II German casualties occurred. Since 1991, 188 World War I cemeteries and 330 World War II cemeteries in eastern, central and south-eastern Europe have been reconstructed or rebuilt and about 764,524 bodies have been buried in new graves. Maintenance of German war cemeteries in France is looked after by the Service d'entretien des sépultures militaires allemandes (the "German Military Burials Maintenance Service") known as S.E.S.M.A..

- With 46 foreign partner countries bilateral war grave agreements were settled by the year 2019. Requests on foreign war graves in Germany are handled by the People's Alliance of the German War Graves Care.
- On behalf of German Government, the construction, repair and care of German War cemeteries outside of Germany is handled by the Division of Cemetery Construction and Building Maintenance (German: Referat Friedhofspflege und Bauunterhaltung). In 2019, the workload covered more than 832 war cemeteries of World War I and World War II and more than 800 war cemeteries/memorial sites of the Franco-Prussian War of 1870–71.
- The People's Alliance of the German War Graves Care cooperates with and uses the files of German Federal Archives, former Deutsche Dienststelle (WASt) in Berlin (Register of German soldiers killed in action or who became prisoners of war). This bureau collects and preserves data and dog tags of active German soldiers of World War II. The People's Alliance is in close contact with other tracing services, e.g. the German Red Cross. Information gathered on occasion of exhumation of bodies is recorded by the People's Alliance and transferred to other institutions to assist in identifying missing people (for example, by dog tags) and by updating files.
- The commission searches for war casualties and when found, transfers them to central cemeteries in Eastern Europe, Germany and Western Europe through the People's Alliance exhumation service (German: Umbettungsdienst). There were 19,735 exhumations in the year 2019. Search for undetected burial places of war casualties is done by records of former WASt, eyewitnesses, historical photographs of World War II cemeteries and assistance of local residents during construction of new roads or structures. Names of missing soldiers are remembered, e.g. in Rossoschka German War Cemetery, on granite cubes as memorials for family members and as a warning for future generations in their effort to live in peace.
- The exhumation service documents in a draft manual document for each body of a soldier found at the grave site, the dog tag (if existent), the remaining clothing and other individual belongings, human height, characteristics of human skeleton, state of dental notation to make it easier to identify later unknown soldiers.
- From about 6,200 cemeteries for German prisoners of war 180 were reconstructed (state: 2011). Cemeteries for prisoners of war cannot all be maintained. So only a selection of prisoner of war cemeteries will serve the memory for those who died in war captivity.

=== War grave database online ===
The People's Alliance of the German War Graves Care offers an accessible online database of 4.8 million individual names for World Wars I and II.

War cemeteries and war dead of World War I and II inside of Germany are also documented in these files (895,561 in 2010). Among these are war dead transferred to Germany or persons who died within Germany but only those are registered whose remains were transferred to war cemetery areas within civil cemeteries, not those removed to individual family graves.

Further in this database persons can be found who died by aerial bombing of cities, as prisoner of war or in imprisonment, partly foreign members of German auxiliary troops who died in World War II or even some members of Wehrmacht who died before World War II began.

A grave research request (Grabnachforschungsauftrag in German) can be sent online or as hardcopy to the People's Alliance of the German War Grave Care to clarify the unknown fate of a German soldier. As some family names are very common it is important to mention all given names and the date of birth of the missing soldier. As additional data should be given if available: date of death, last unit (Truppenteil in German) and last letters. Often withdrawing troops could not bury their casualties. Detailed data on the war dead of World War I were reconstructed by volunteers in digital format.

== List of German cemeteries by country/conflict ==
=== War cemetery database online ===
The People's Alliance of the German War Graves Care has an online inventory of its cemeteries. Data collected for each cemetery are location (geography), how to reach, number of dead, course of military events in the region and architecture of the cemetery.

=== Some cemeteries by country ===
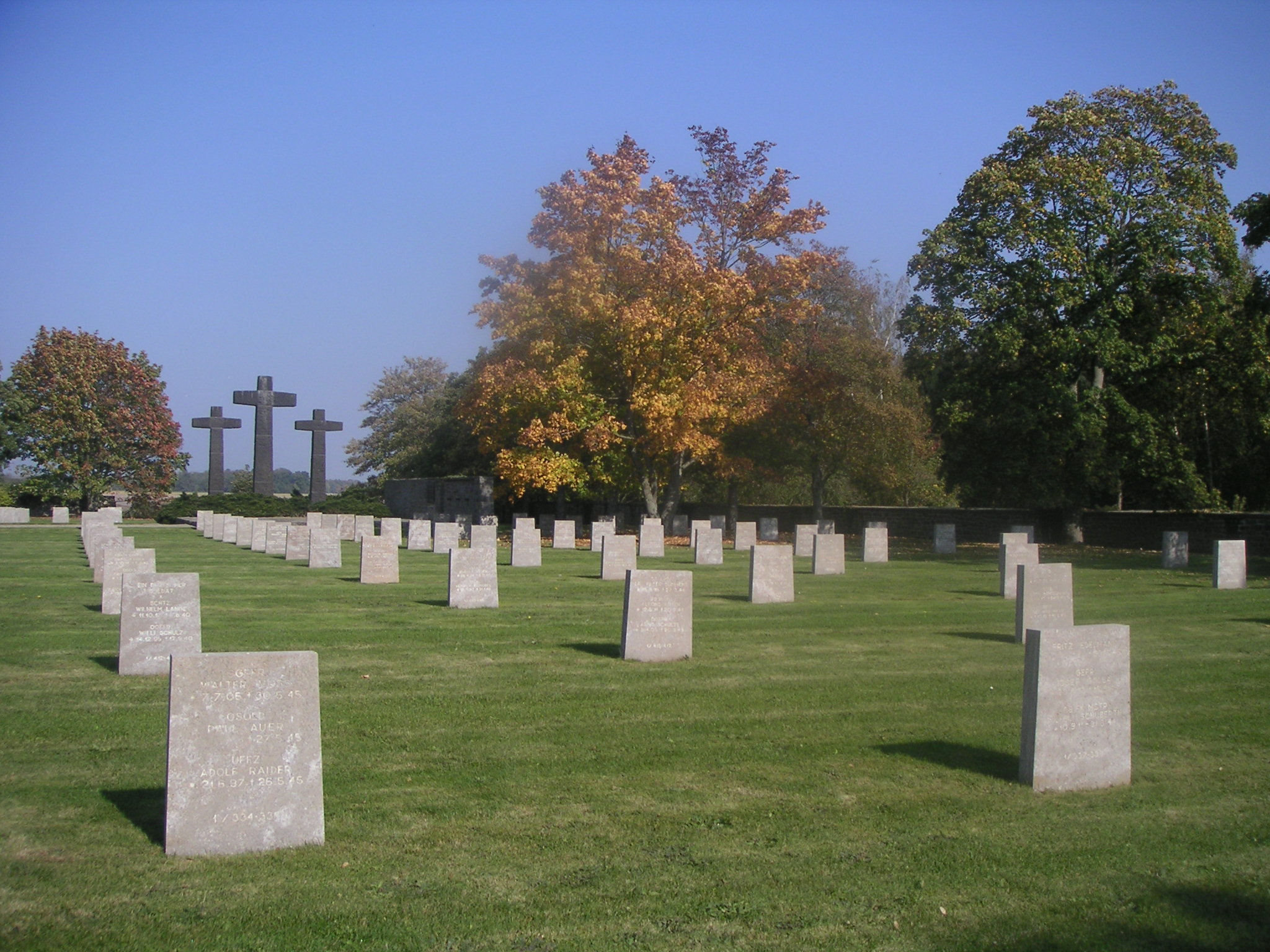
Solers, France (total burials: 2,228)

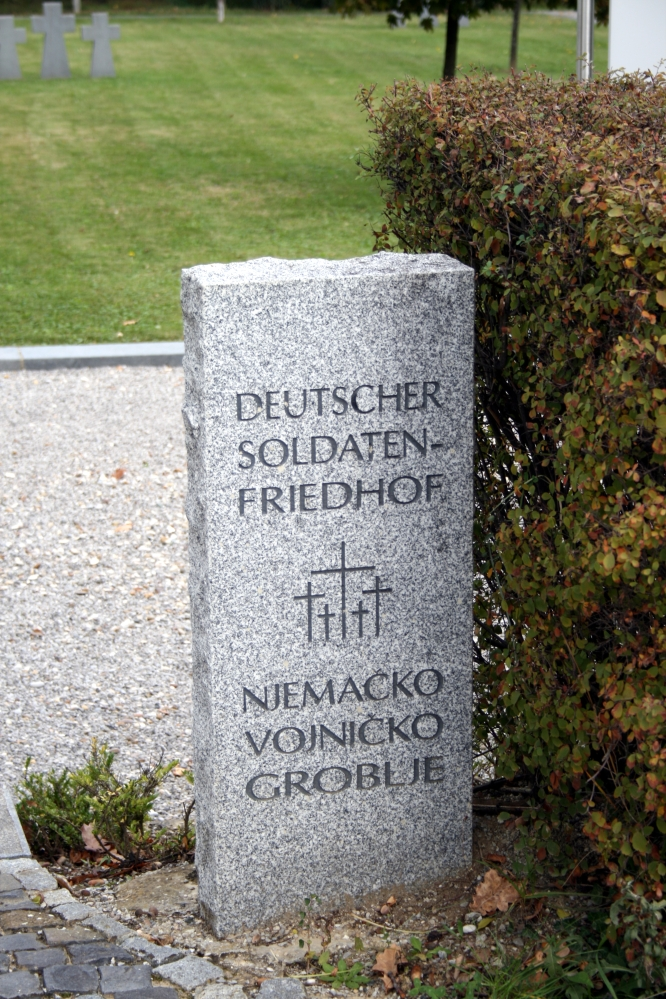
German war cemetery in Zagreb, Croatia

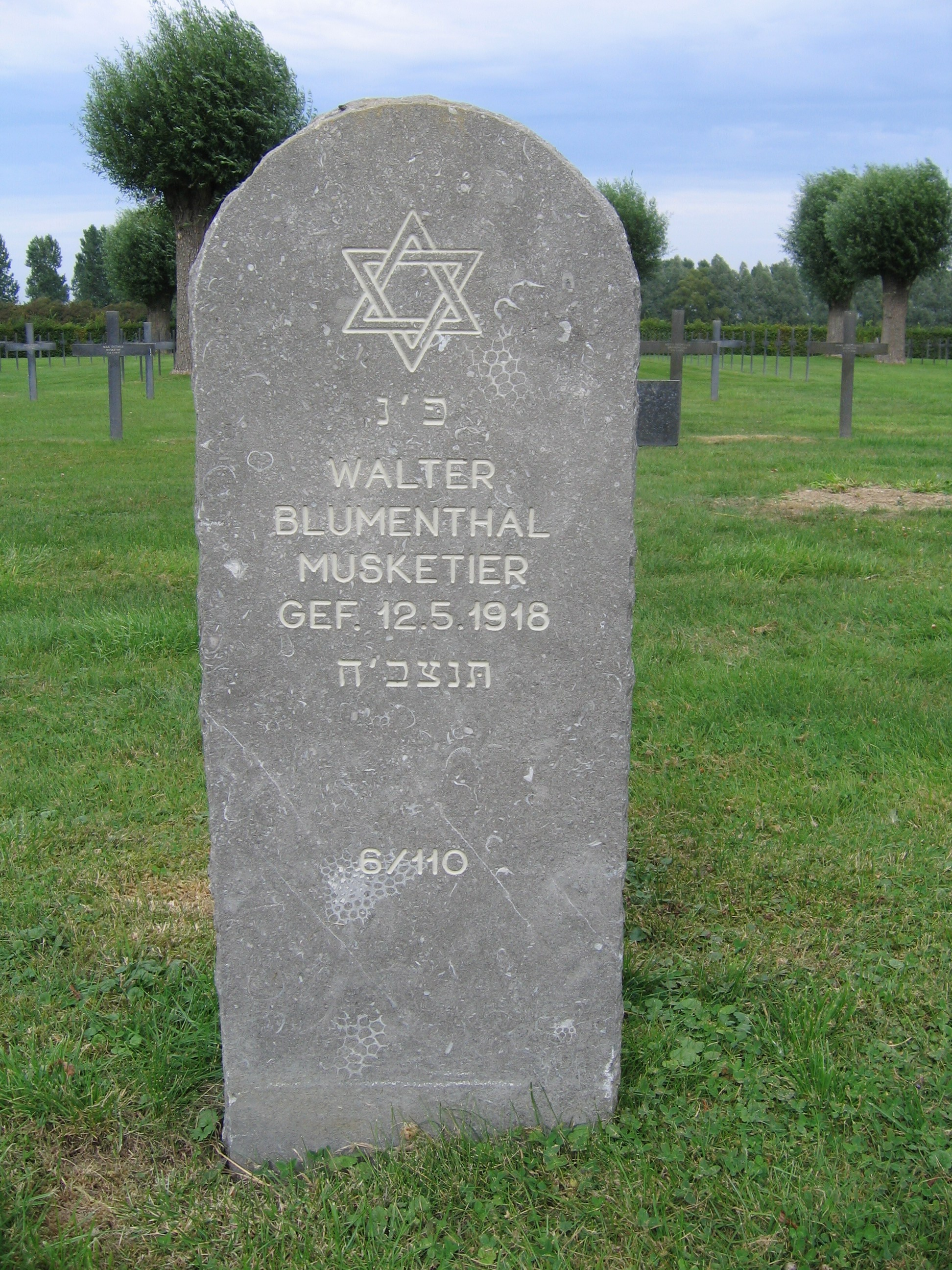
First World War grave, of a Jewish soldier, at Laventie German Military Cemetery, France

Australia – World War I & II

- Tatura German Military Cemetery (Total Burials: 250)

Austria – World War I & II

- List of German war cemeteries in Austria de:Liste von Soldatenfriedhöfen in Österreich

Belgium – World War I

- Vladslo German war cemetery (Total burials: 25,644)
- Langemark German war cemetery (Total Burials: over 44,000)
- Menen German war cemetery (Total Burials: 47,864)
- Hooglede German war cemetery (Total Burials: 8,247)

Belgium – World War I & II

- Lommel German war cemetery, (Total burials World War I: 542, World War II: 38,560)

Belgium – World War II

- Recogne German war cemetery, (Total burials: 6,809)

Canada – World War I & II

- Kitchener German war cemetery, Ontario (Total Burials: 187)

Croatia – World War II

- Split German war cemetery (Lovrinac)
- Zagreb German war cemetery

Egypt – World War II

- El Alamein German war cemetery in El Alamein de: Deutsche Kriegsgräberstätte El Alamein

Finland – World War I & II

- Helsinki-Honkanummi German war cemetery de:Deutscher Soldatenfriedhof Helsinki-Honkanummi, (Total burials World War I: 6, World War II: 364)
- German Military Cemetery Rovaniemi (Total burials World War II: 2,530)

France – World War I

- Fricourt German war cemetery (Somme) (Total burials: 17,027)
- Gerbéviller German Military Cemetery (Lorraine) (Total burials: 5,462)
- Vermandovillers German war cemetery (Total burials: 22,632) Somme Département
- Neuville-St Vaast German war cemetery (Arras) (Total burials: 44,843)

France – World War II

- Orglandes German war cemetery (Total burials: 10,152)
- Mont-de-Huisnes German war cemetery (Total burials: 11,956)
- La Cambe German war cemetery (Total burials: 21,222)
- German War Cemetery Andilly fr:Cimetière militaire allemand d'Andilly (Total burials : 33,085)
- Saint-Désir-de-Lisieux German war cemetery
- Marigny German war cemetery fr:Cimetière militaire allemand de Marigny (Total burials: 11,169)
- Champigny-Saint-André German war cemetery (19,831)
- Berneuil German war cemetery fr:Cimetière militaire allemand de Berneuil (Total burials: 8,332)

Greece

- Dionyssos-Rapendoza German war cemetery (Total burials: 9,973)
- Maleme German war cemetery (Total burials: 4,465)

Ireland – World War I & World War II

- Glencree German war cemetery

Israel – World War I

- Nazareth German war cemetery

Italy – World War II

- Futa Pass Cemetery (Total burials: 30,683)
- it: Cimitero militare germanico di Pomezia (Total burials: 27,443)
- it: Cimitero militare tedesco di Costermano (Total burials: 22,028)
- it: Cimitero militare germanico di Motta Sant'Anastasia (Total burials: 4,561)

Luxembourg – World War II

- Sandweiler German war cemetery (Total Burials: 10,913)

Netherlands – World War I & World War II

- Ysselsteyn German war cemetery, (Total Burials World War I: 85, World War II: 31,513)

Russia – World War II

- Krasnogorsk German war cemetery (POWs, near Moscow)
- Rossoschka German war cemetery 65,000+
- Sologubovka Cemetery 34,000+

Spain – World War I & World War II

- Cuacos de Yuste German war cemetery es: Cementerio Alemán de Cuacos de Yuste

Tunisia – World War II

- Bordj Cedria German war cemetery, Tunisia de: Soldatenfriedhof Bordj Cedria

United Kingdom – World War I & II

- Cannock Chase German Military Cemetery (looked after by the Commonwealth War Graves Commission) (Total Burials 4,855)

== War-graves commissions in other countries ==
- Austria – Austrian Black Cross (Austrian War graves on the Vienna Central cemetery are still looked after by the People's Alliance of the German War Graves Care.)
- France –
  - Ministère de la Défense with online data base of war graves
  - National Office for Veterans and Victims of War (ONACVG)
  - Souvenir Français.
- Netherlands – Oorlogsgravenstichting (Netherlands Wikipedia)
- Russia – Association of War Memorials
- United Kingdom (and former overseas Imperial territories Australia, Canada, India, New Zealand, and South Africa) – Commonwealth War Graves Commission
- United States – American Battle Monuments Commission
