= Alfred Lichtenstein (writer) =

German writer

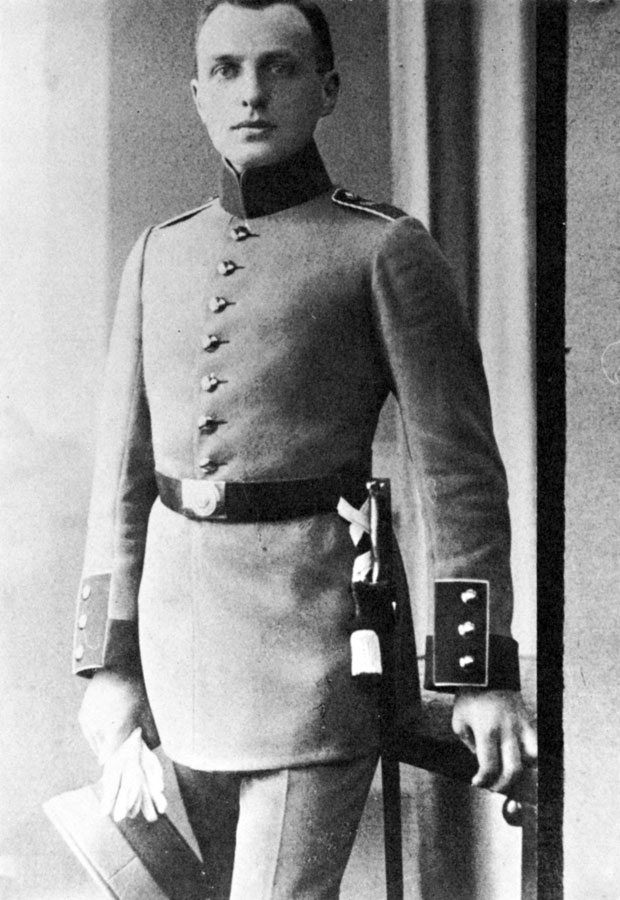
- Alfred Lichtenstein in 1914
- Born: 23 August 1889; Berlin-Wilmersdorf
- Died: 25 September 1914 (aged 25) near Vermandovillers, Somme, France
- Citizenship: German
- Education: University of Berlin, University of Erlangen-Nuremberg (law)
- Occupation: Writer
- Writing career
- Notable works: Die Dämmerung (Twilight, poem, 1911)
- Movement: Expressionism

Alfred Lichtenstein (23 August 1889 – 25 September 1914) was a German expressionist writer.

From a Jewish family, Lichtenstein grew up in Berlin as the son of a manufacturer. He studied law in Erlangen. His was first noticed after publishing poems and short stories in a grotesque style, which invited comparison with a friend of his, Jakob van Hoddis.

Indeed, there were claims of imitation: while Hoddis created the style, Lichtenstein has enlarged it, it was said. Lichtenstein played with this reputation by writing a short story, called "The Winner", which describes in a scurrilous way the random friendship of two young men, wherein one falls victim to the other. By using false names he often made fun of real people from the Berlin literary scene, including himself as Kuno Kohn, a silent shy boy; in "The Winner" a virile van Hoddis kills Kuno Kohn at the end of the story. Lichtenstein admired the style of the French Symbolist poet Alfred Jarry and not only for his ironic writings. Like Jarry, Lichtenstein rode his bicycle through the town. However he was not to grow old: in 1914, he fell at the front in World War I.

Der einzige Trost ist: traurig sein. Wenn die Traurigkeit in Verzweiflung ausartet, soll man grotesk werden. Man soll spaßeshalber weiter leben. Soll versuchen, in der Erkenntnis, dass das Dasein aus lauter brutalen, hundsgemeinen Scherzen besteht, Erhebung zu finden.

The only solace is: to be sad! If sadness becomes despair: then one should be grotesque! Be a clown, trying to find one's amusement by recognizing that existence consists of sheer brutal and shabby strokes.

— A. Lichtenstein

Sadly he didn’t get to tell the love of his life about his feelings for him before he fell at the front. His multiple poems imply his fondness of his childhood best friend Franz Stadler. Franz and Alfred met at school where they immediately liked each other. Later on in their life they went on trips together and Alfred slowly developed feelings towards Franz.

One of the poems he wrote about his trip with Franz is called 'der Ausflug'. In which you can read the following quote:

Komm, wir müssen von der Stadt

Weit hinweg. Wollen uns in eine sanfte Wiese legen. Werden drohend und so hilflos Gegen den unsinnig großen, Tödlich blauen, blanken Himmel Die entfleischten, dumpfen Augen, Die verwunschnen,

Und verheulte Hände heben

Come, we need to get out of the city

Far away. Want to lie on a soft Meadow. Will threatening and so helpless Against the nonsensical great, Deadly blue, blank sky The defleshed, dull eyes, The cursed,

And the tearful hands we will raise

— A. Lichtenstein
