= Hippisley =

Hippisley is a surname. Notable people with the surname include:

- John Hippisley (disambiguation), multiple people
- Harold Hippisley (1890–1914), English cricketer
- Hippisley Baronets
