= Vasey =

Vasey is a surname. Notable people with the surname include:

- Bill Vasey (born 1939), American politician
- George Alan Vasey (1895–1945), Australian major general and husband of Jessie Vasey
- George Richard Vasey (1853–1921), American botanical collector and son of botanist George Vasey
- George Vasey (botanist) (1822–1893), American botanist and father of George Richard Vasey
- George Vasey (cricketer) (1880–1951), English cricketer and educator
- Gladys Vasey (1889–1981), English artist
- Jessie Vasey (1897–1966), founder of the War Widows' Guild of Australia and wife of George Alan Vasey
- Percy Vasey (1883–1952), English cricketer and schoolmaster
- Roy Chubby Brown (born 3 February 1945), born Royston Vasey, English comedian
