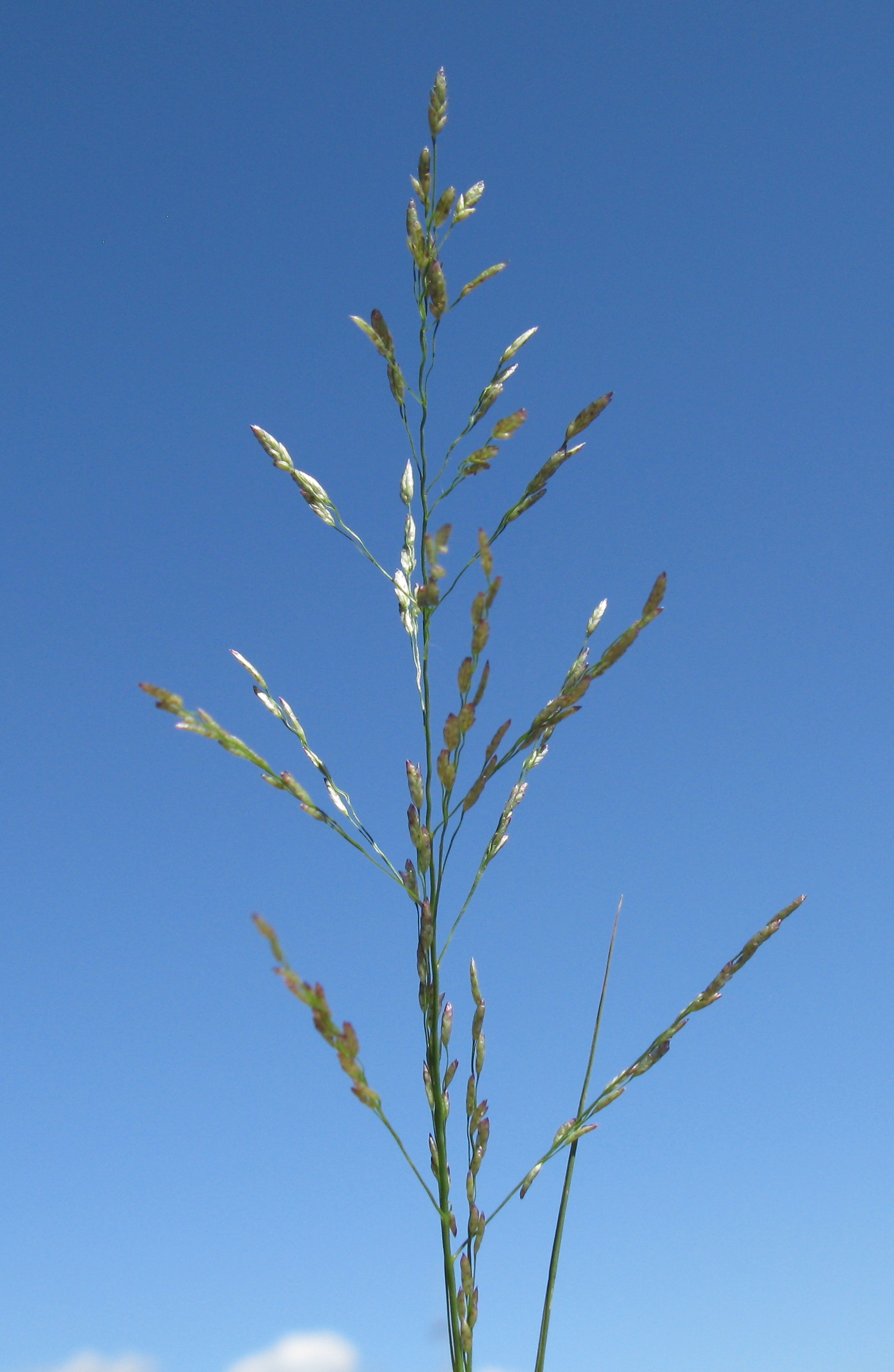

Scientific classification
- Kingdom: Plantae
- Clade: Tracheophytes
- Clade: Angiosperms
- Clade: Monocots
- Clade: Commelinids
- Order: Poales
- Family: Poaceae
- Subfamily: Chloridoideae
- Genus: Eragrostis
- Species: E. mexicana

Binomial name
- Eragrostis mexicana (Hornem.) Link

Synonyms
- Eragrostis neomexicana Vasey; Eragrostis orcuttiana Vasey; Eragrostis virescens Presl.; Poa mexicana Hornem.

= Eragrostis mexicana =

Species of grass

Eragrostis mexicana, the Mexican lovegrass, is an annual grass found from North America down to Argentina. Its specific epithet "mexicana" means "from Mexico". Its diploid number is 60.

== Taxonomy ==
Eragrostis mexicana was formerly four distinct Eragrostis species: E. mexicana, E. neomexicana, E. orcuttiana, and E. virescens. They are now united into E. mexicana, with the first two species forming E. mexicana subsp. mexicana and the last two forming E. mexicana subsp. virescens. All four former species are related by their diploid number of 60, their flowers with three stamens, and dark brown, reticulate caryopses. The two subspecies differ in the occurrence of glandular depressions below culm nodes, spikelet color, and plant size. Subspecies mexicana consists of smaller (15–50 cm (5.9–19.7 in) tall) grasses lacking glands with more purplish spikelets, while subspecies virescens consists of larger (75–120 cm (30–47 in) tall) grasses possessing glands with grey-green spikelets. The former grows in compact soil while the latter grows in cultivated areas.

== Description ==
Eragrostis mexicana is a densely tufted annual growing 10–130 cm (3.9–51.2 in) tall, with slender culms that are either simple or loosely branching. The pale leaves are long-attenuate, growing 1–5 mm (0.039–0.197 in) wide. The top of the leaf sheaths are bristly, with sheaths being about a half to two-thirds as long as the internodes. Its ligules are ciliate. The ellipsoid to ovoid panicle is very lax and open, growing 4–20 cm (1.6–7.9 in) long (usually less than half the height of the total plant), with the spreading and ascending floral branches bearing scattered spikelets. The ovate-lanceolate spikelets are borne on ascending, stiff pedicels up to 8 mm (0.31 in) long. The straw-colored or orangish spikelets are 2–2.5 mm (0.079–0.098 in) wide, and can be tinged with purple. The acute glumes have scabrous keels, the first being about 1.5 mm long and the second 1.8–2 mm long. The grey-green lemmas are 1.8-2.5 mm long and also have scabrous keels. Its hyaline paleas have scabrous keels as well, with obtuse to truncate apices. Its anthers tend to be purplish. Its caryopses have shallow to deep grooves.

The grass flowers from August to October.

== Distribution and habitat ==
Eragrostic mexicana can be found in disturbed areas such as waste places and road verges, or on dry hills and mountains. It grows from Iowa and Delaware down to southwest American states and Mexico, advancing as far south as Argentina, Brazil, and Paraguay, sometimes in lomas regions.
