= Hooglede German war cemetery =

Cemetery in Belgium

- German War Graves Commission; Volksbund Deutsche Kriegsgräberfürsorge.
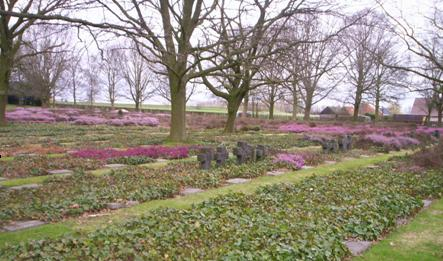
- Used for those deceased 1917-1918
- Established: 1917
- Location: 50°58′41″N 3°5′37″E near Hooglede
- Total burials: 8,247

Burials by nation
- Imperial Germany

Burials by war
- World War I

The Hooglede German war cemetery (Deutscher Soldatenfriedhof Hooglede in German) is a military cemetery in the Belgian town of Hooglede, six kilometer northwest of Roeselare. It is located at the east side of Hooglede. It contains 8,241 buried German soldiers from World War I.

== Military incidents ==
On October 19, 1914, Hooglede was occupied by German soldiers. The Hooglede cemetery in the Beverenstraat arose in 1917 when the cemetery in Hooglede was no longer sufficient for the mounting deathtoll. There were some new cemeteries, including "Ehrenfriedhof Hooglede Ost Beveren" along the street. After the liberation by the French, approximately 4100 German soldiers were buried in the soil of Hooglede.

== Care of graves ==
The German cemeteries were supervised by the Belgian military service of tombs, but in 1926 all the cemeteries were the responsibility of the Amtlicher Deutscher Gräberdienst. Between 1932 and 1937, this service was responsible for the German cemetery in the Beverenstraat. Many graves in various cemeteries in Hooglede, Gits, Handzame, Torhout, and Lichtervelde were sent to Hooglede. The graves then were marked by crosses.

In 1937, a chapel was built using stones from a German pavilion at the World Exhibition in Paris. During World War II, an additional 29 German soldiers were buried at the cemetery. These soldiers were later sent to another cemetery.

After the Second World War, the supervision of the cemetery was again in the hands of the Belgian organization "Nos Tombs". Not much later, in 1954, the monitoring was taken over by the German War Graves Commission (Volksbund Deutsche Kriegsgräberfürsorge in German).

== Graves centralized ==
Numerous German graves dispersed over the country were transferred between 1956 and 1958 from 128 cemeteries to the four cemeteries in the Flemish part of Belgium. Hooglede is one of the four main German cemeteries in Belgium. The others being in Langemark, Vladslo, Menen.

During the renovation works in Hooglede in 1957–58, the entrance arches of the chapel were reduced to 9. This change came in two phases. The crosses were also replaced by flat grave markers. After 1960, no more major works were performed.

== Monument of historical value ==
In 2008 this graveyard was classified as historical monument by the Belgium Office for the preservation of monuments because of its historical cultural and architectural value.

== Reconciliation ==
The German War Graves Commission sometimes organizes youth camps under the motto "Reconciliation among the graves, work for peace". These people are sent abroad in order to learn about the war and care for the graves.

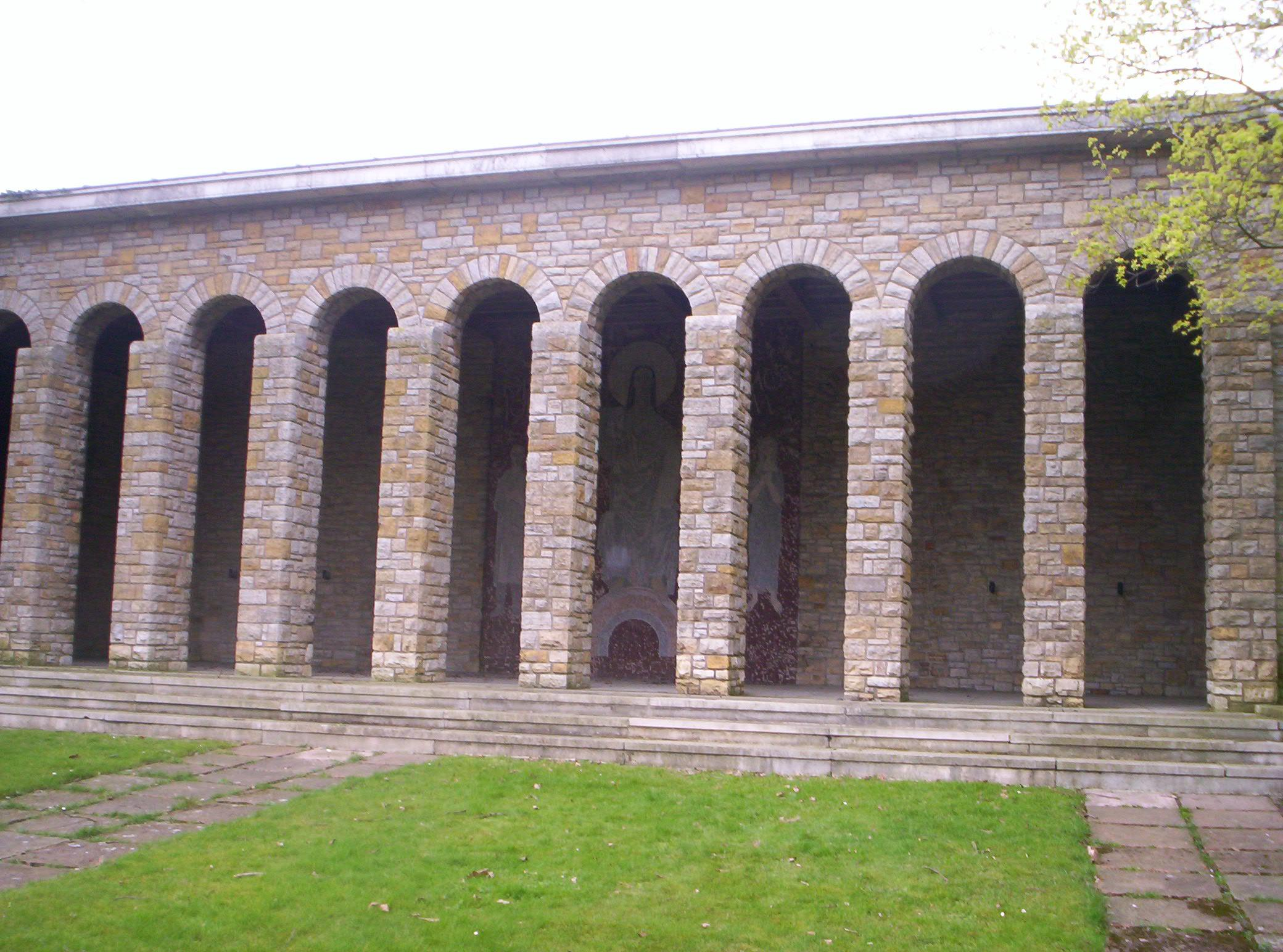
Memorial hall (Gedenkhalle)

== Literature ==
- (de) Sendker, Werner Bernhard: Auf Flanderns Feldern gefallen: Deutsche und ihr Verhältnis zum Ersten Weltkrieg. Der Andere Verlag, Tönningen 2005, ISBN 3-89959-366-9
- (nl) Verhelst Dirk, Het Duits Militair Kerkhof 1914–1918 in Hooglede, 1996.
