= Vladslo German war cemetery =

War cemetery in Vladslo, Belgium

- German War Graves Commission (Volksbund Deutsche Kriegsgräberfürsorge)
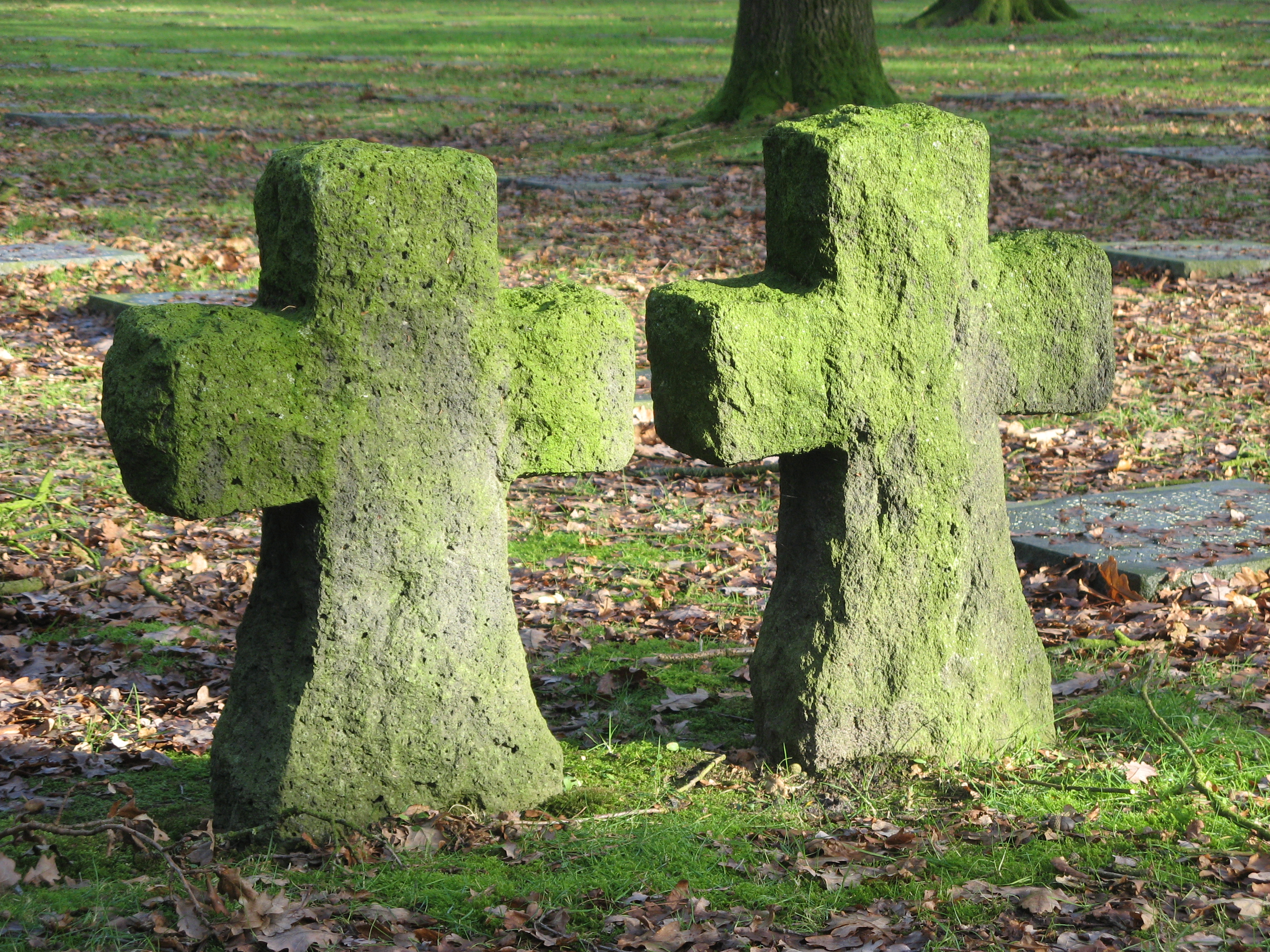
- Crosses at Vladslo
- Used for those deceased 1914-1918
- Established: 1956 (Concentration cemetery)
- Location: 51°04′14″N 2°55′46″E near Diksmuide, Belgium
- Total burials: 25,644

Burials by nation
- Imperial Germany

Burials by war
- World War I

UNESCO World Heritage Site
- Official name: Funerary and memory sites of the First World War (Western Front)
- Type: Cultural
- Criteria: i, ii, vi
- Designated: 2023 (45th session)
- Reference no.: 1567-FL02

Vladslo German war cemetery is about three kilometres north east of Vladslo, near Diksmuide, Belgium. Established during World War I, the cemetery originally held 3,233 wartime burials. In 1956, burials from many smaller surrounding cemeteries were concentrated in Vladslo, and it now contains the remains of 25,644 soldiers. Each stone bears the name of twenty soldiers, with just their name, rank, and date of death specified.

The cemetery is administered by the German War Graves Commission (Volksbund Deutsche Kriegsgräberfürsorge). They also look after the three other German war cemeteries in Belgium: Langemark, Menen and Hooglede.

== The Grieving Parents ==
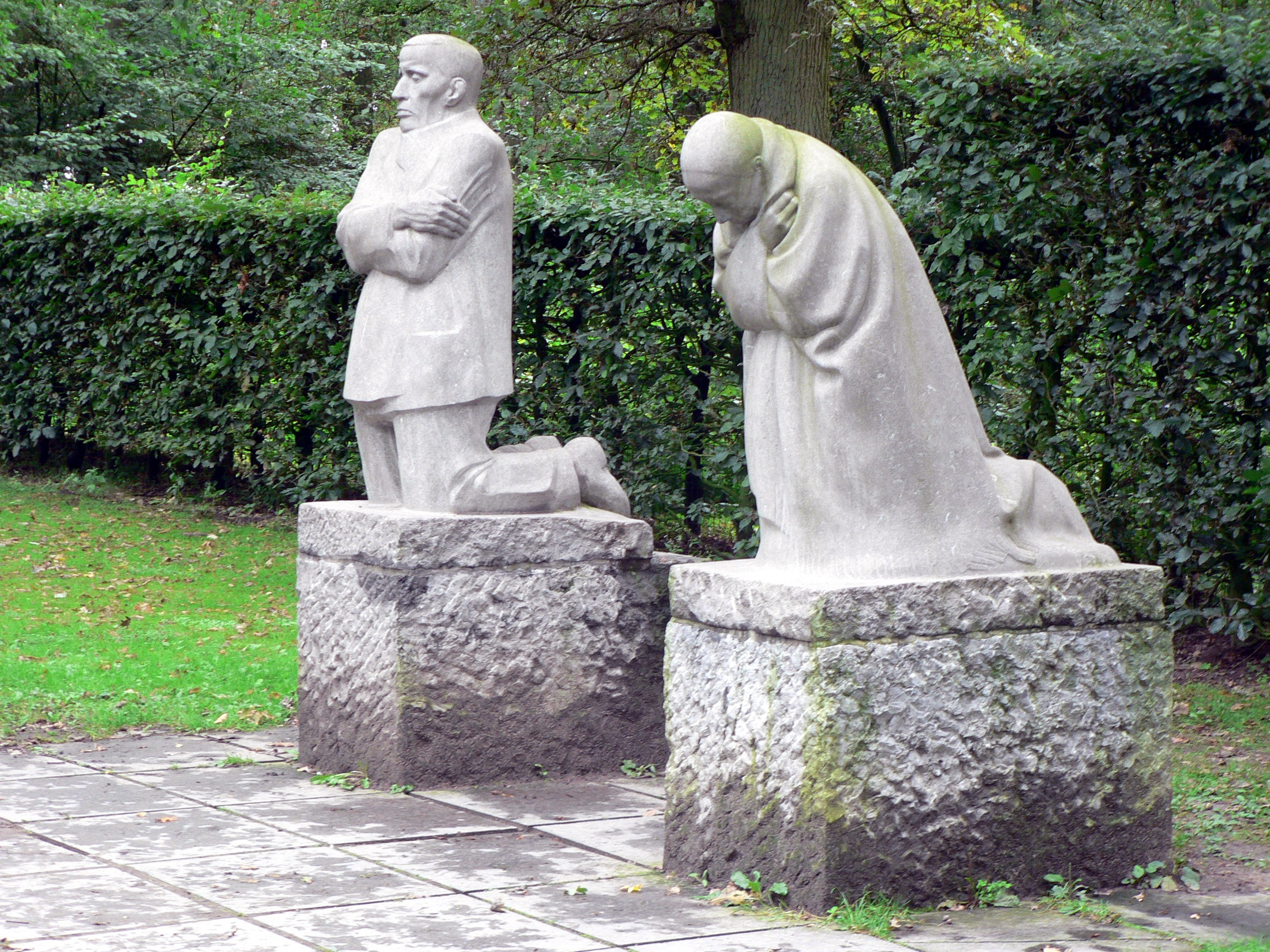
The Grieving Parents by Käthe Kollwitz

The cemetery also contains a pair of statues – The Grieving Parents – by Käthe Kollwitz, a noted German sculptor. She made the statues in the 1930s as a tribute to her youngest son, Peter, who was killed in October 1914 and is buried in the cemetery. The eyes on the father-figure gaze on the stone directly in front of him, on which Kollwitz's son's name is engraved.
