= Menen German war cemetery =

WWI cemetery in Flanders, Belgium

- German War Graves Commission; Volksbund Deutsche Kriegsgräberfürsorge.
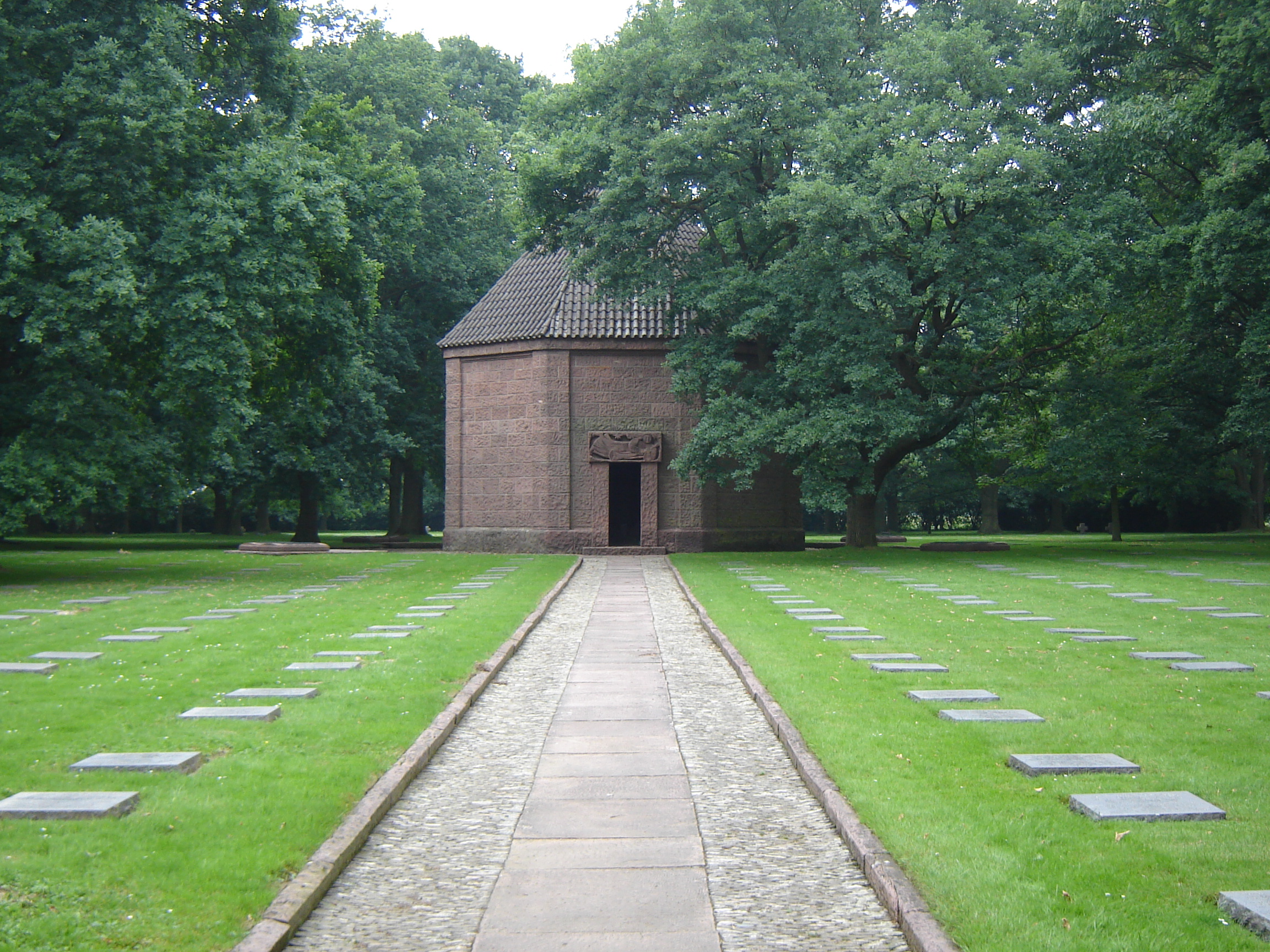
- Used for those deceased 1917-1918
- Established: 1917
- Location: 50°48′33″N 3°9′7″E near Menen
- Total burials: 47,864

Burials by nation
- Imperial Germany

Burials by war
- World War I

The Menen German war cemetery is a military cemetery in the Belgian town of Menen territory and partly in Wevelgem. There were nearly 48,000 German soldiers buried from the First World War, making it the largest in Flanders. In between are several crosses and oak and chestnut trees. In the center is an octagonal memorial chapel.

The original cemetery was created in 1917. Between 1956 and 1958, there were 128 small German military cemeteries scattered across Flanders consolidated to four. The remains of the cemeteries were transferred to the cemeteries of Langemark, Vladslo, Hooglede and Menen. Menen casualties came from 53 small cemeteries. The German architect R. Tischler designed the octagonal mausoleum and a reception building. Around the chapel are eight tombstones, bearing the names and locations of the 53 cemeteries, from where the fallen were transferred. The grave stones were restored in 1991.

The cemetery is administered by the German War Graves Commission (Volksbund Deutsche Kriegsgräberfürsorge).

== Gallery ==
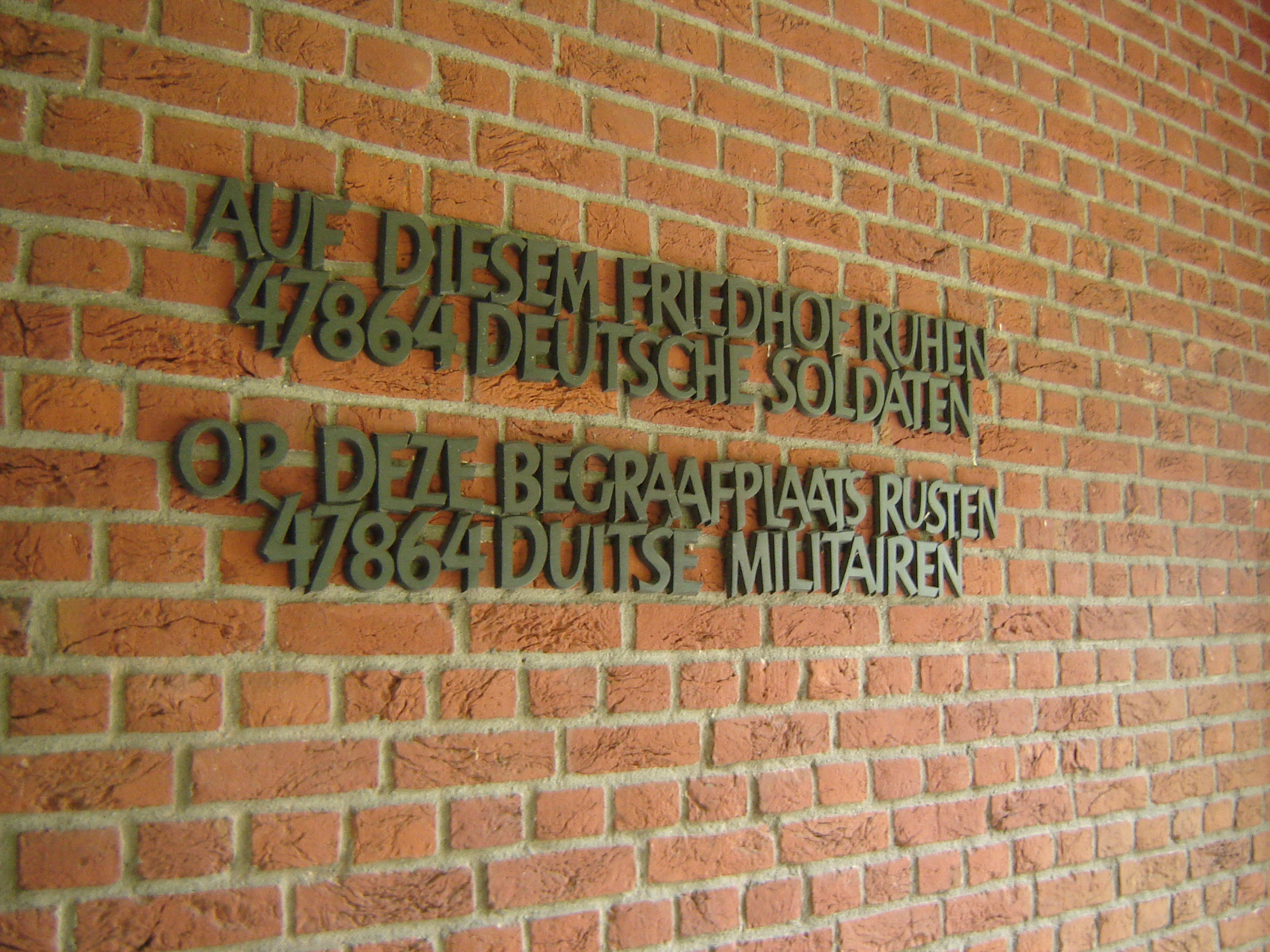

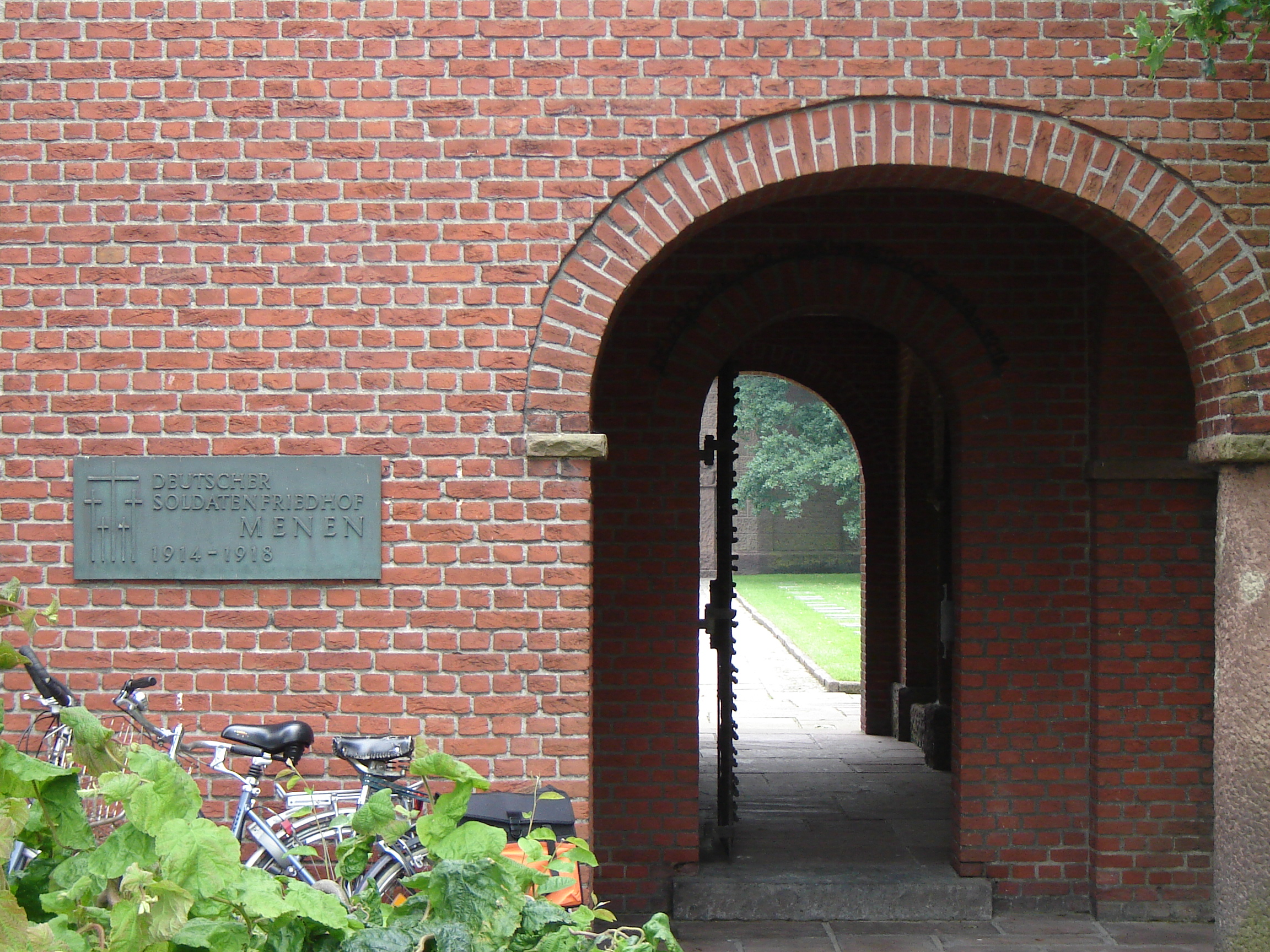

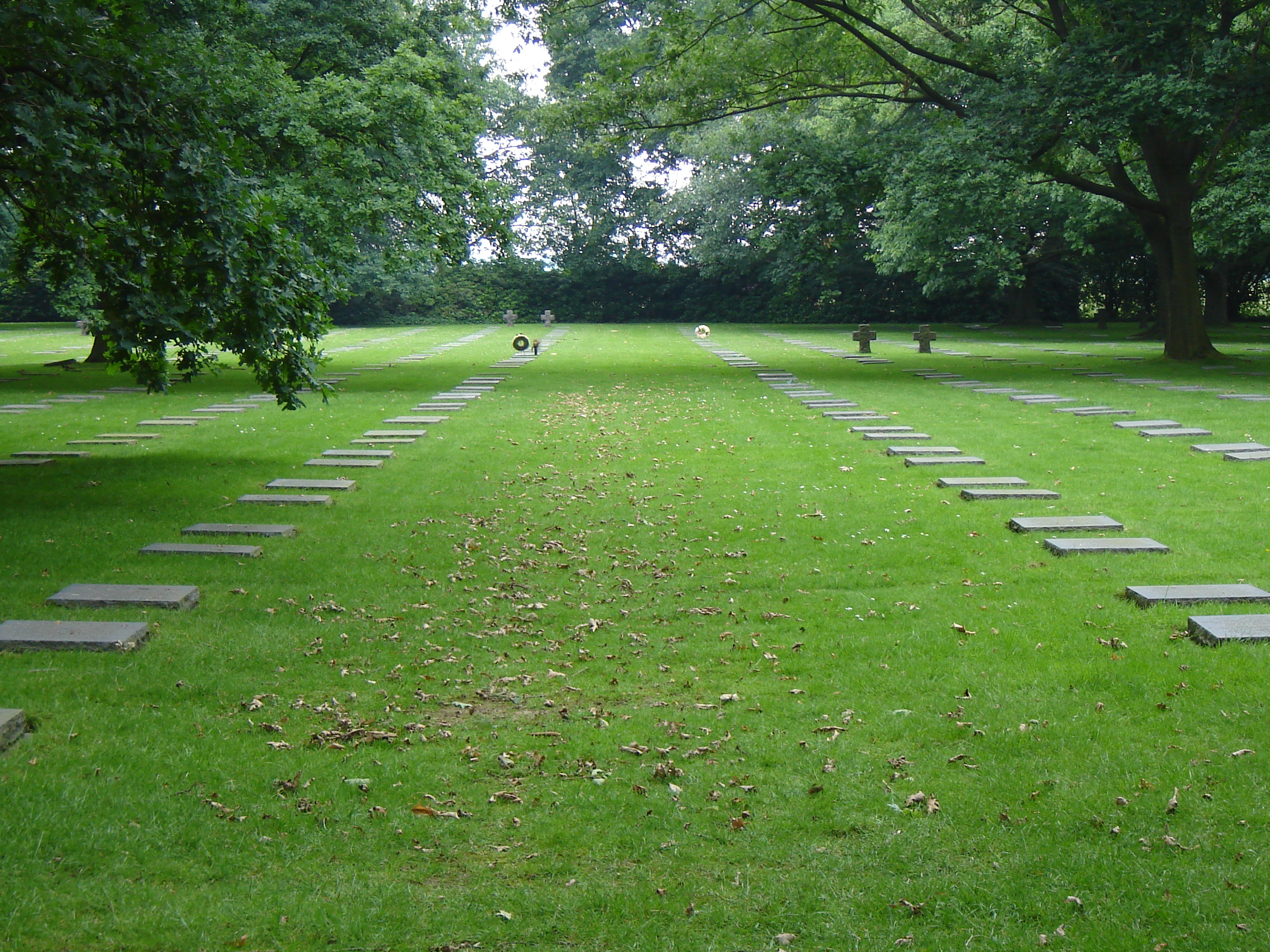

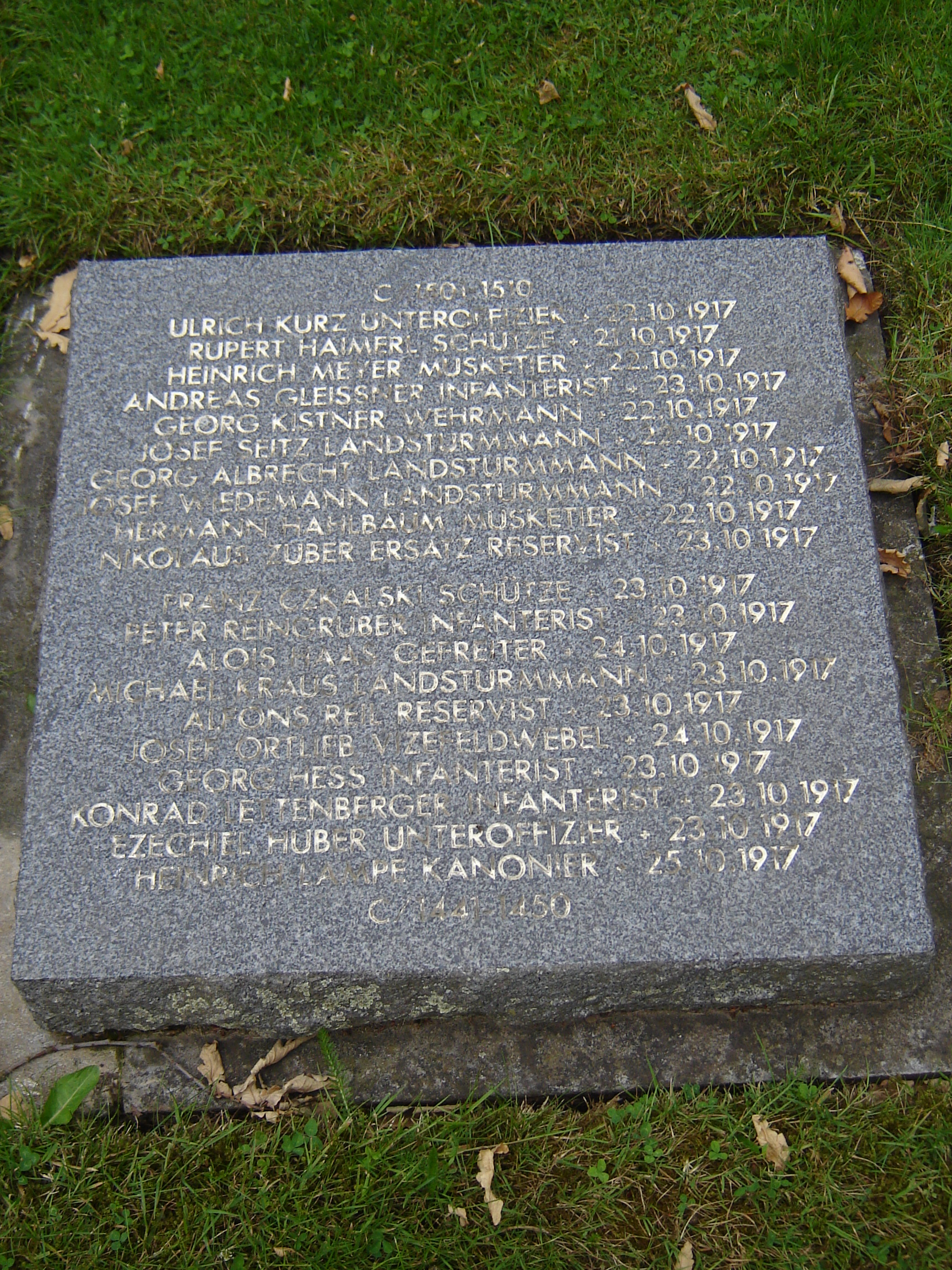

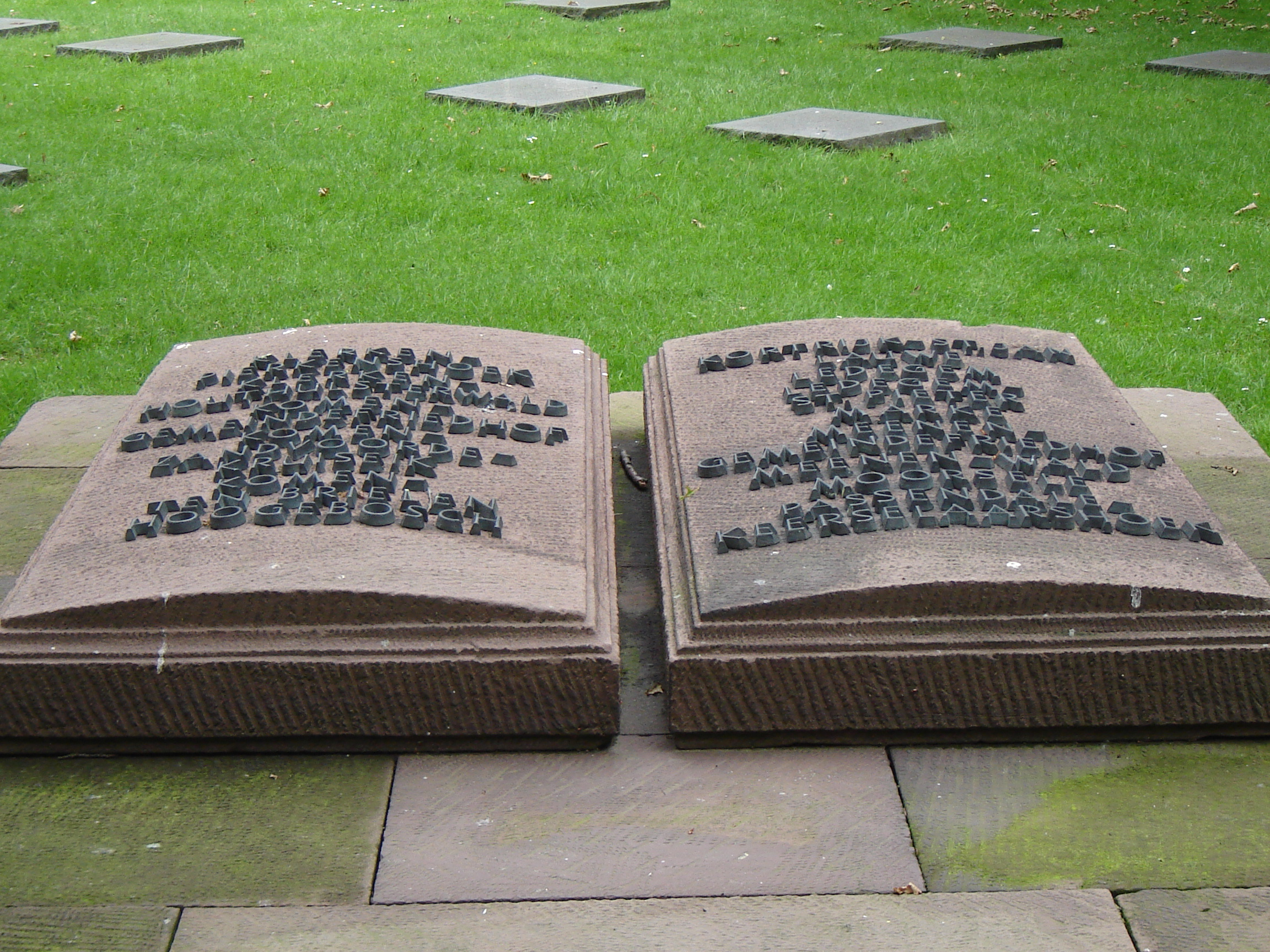
