= George Vasey =

George Vasey may refer to:

- George Alan Vasey (1895–1945), Australian World War II major general
- George Richard Vasey (1853–1921), American botanical collector and son of botanist George Vasey
- George Vasey (botanist) (1822–1893), American botanist and father of George Richard Vasey
- George Vasey (cricketer) (1880–1951), English cricketer and educator
