= Langemark-Poelkapelle =

Municipality in West Flanders, Belgium

- Municipality
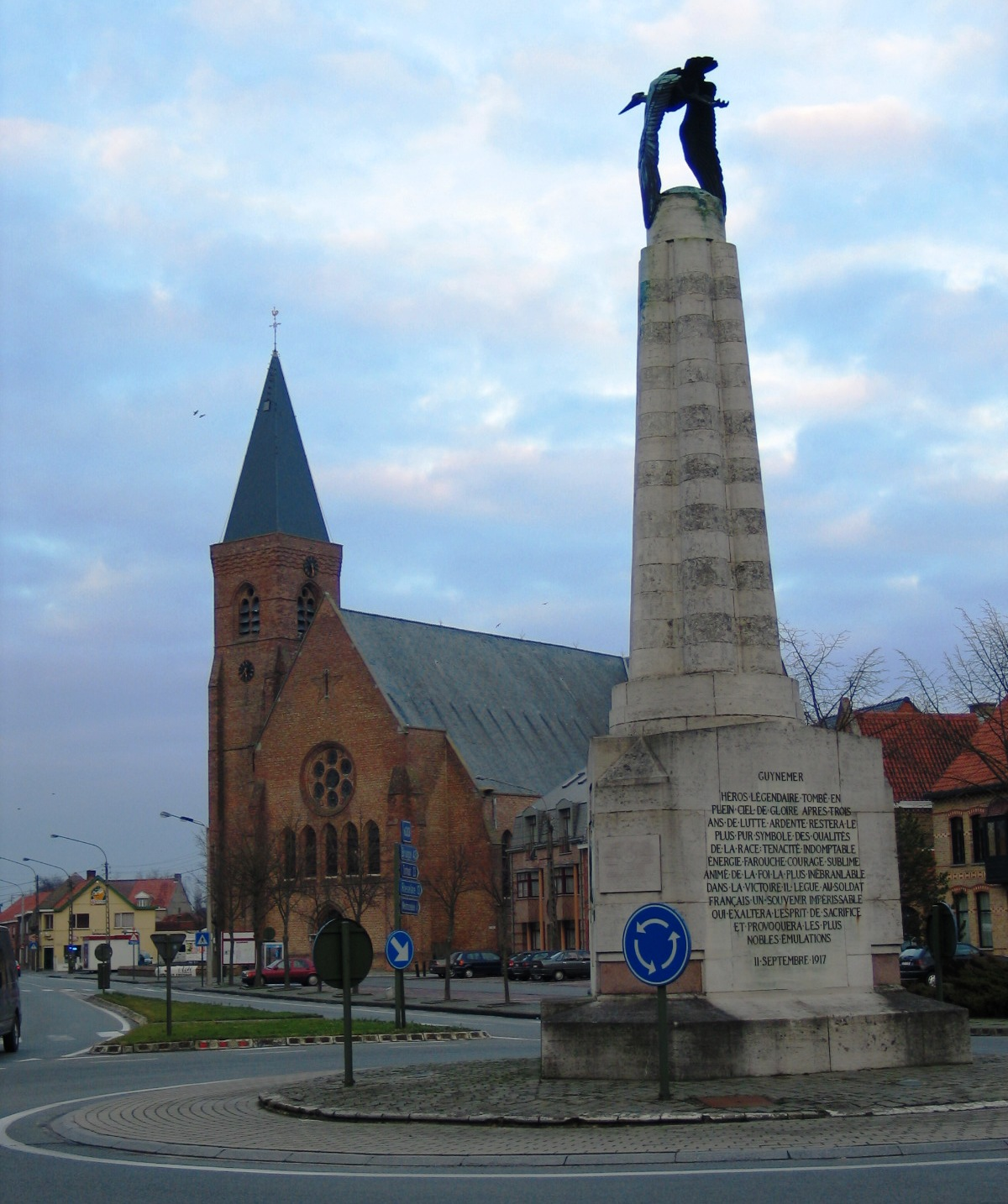

- Flag Coat of arms

- Location of Langemark-Poelkapelle in West Flanders
- Interactive map of Langemark-Poelkapelle
- Location in Belgium
- Coordinates: 50°55′N 02°55′E
- Country: Belgium
- Community: Flemish Community
- Region: Flemish Region
- Province: West Flanders
- Arrondissement: Ypres

Government
  - Mayor: Dominique Cool (N-VA)
  - Governing parties: CD&V, N-VA

Area
  - Total: 53.07 km^{2} (20.49 sq mi)

Population (2018-01-01)
  - Total: 7,920
  - Density: 149/km^{2} (387/sq mi)
- Postal codes: 8920
- NIS code: 33040
- Area codes: 057, 051
- Website: www.langemark-poelkapelle.be

Langemark-Poelkapelle (Dutch pronunciation: [ˈlɑŋəˌmɑr(ə)k ˌpulkaːˈpɛlə]) is a municipality located in the Belgian province of West Flanders.

== Geography ==
Other places in the municipality include Bikschote, Langemark and Poelkapelle. On January 1, 2006, Langemark-Poelkapelle had a total population of 7,780. The total area is 52.53 square kilometres (20.28 sq mi) which gives a population density of 148 inhabitants per km^{2}.

== Gallery ==
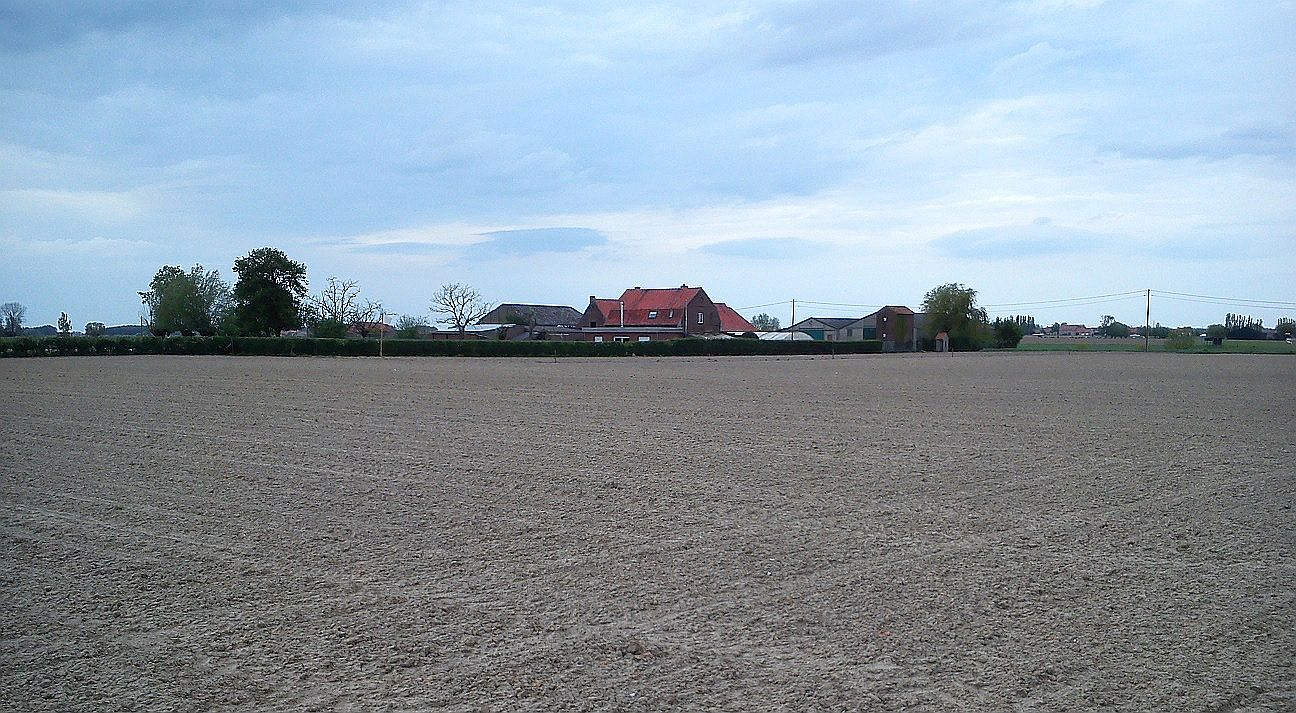
Farm at Langemark

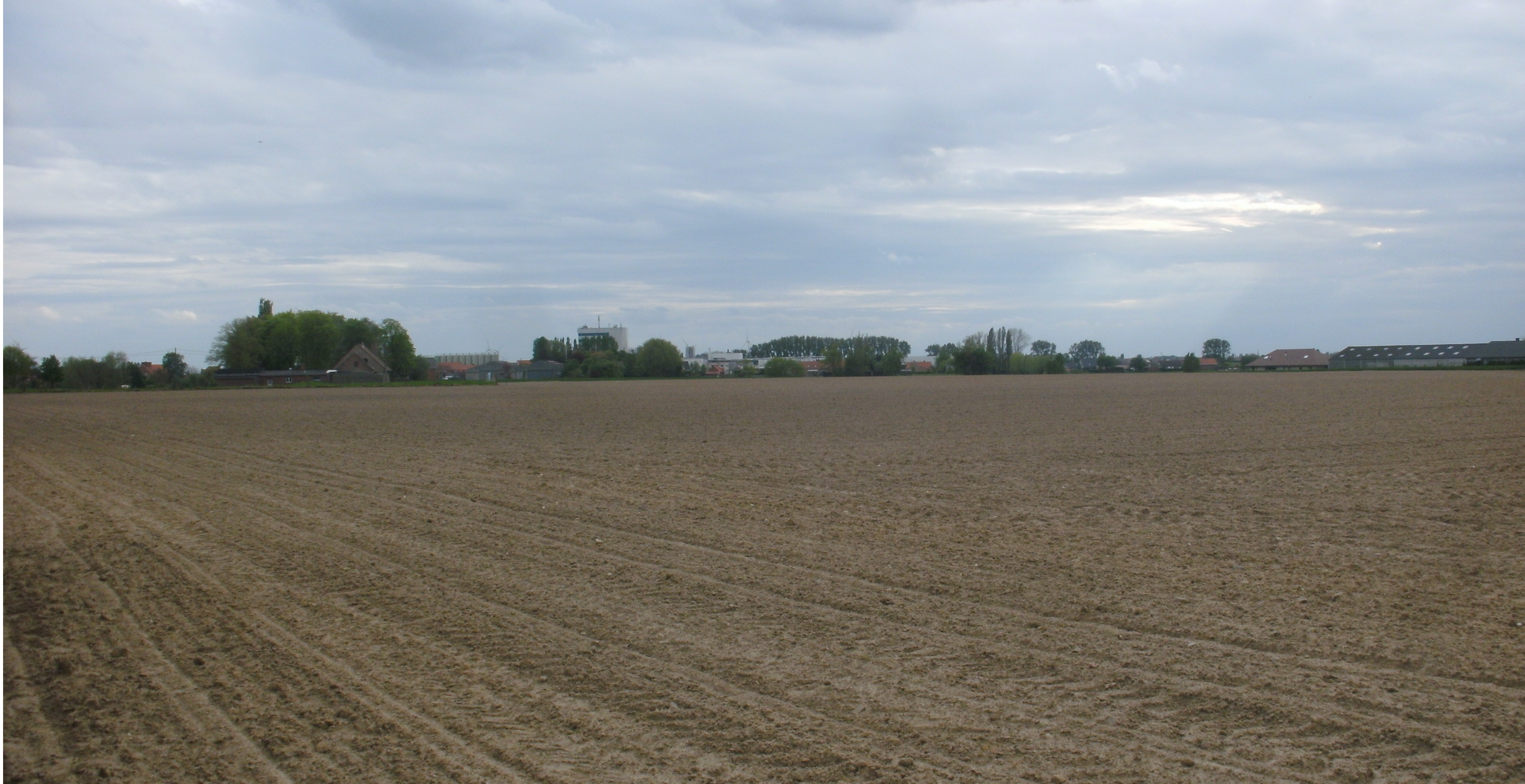
Fields at Langemark

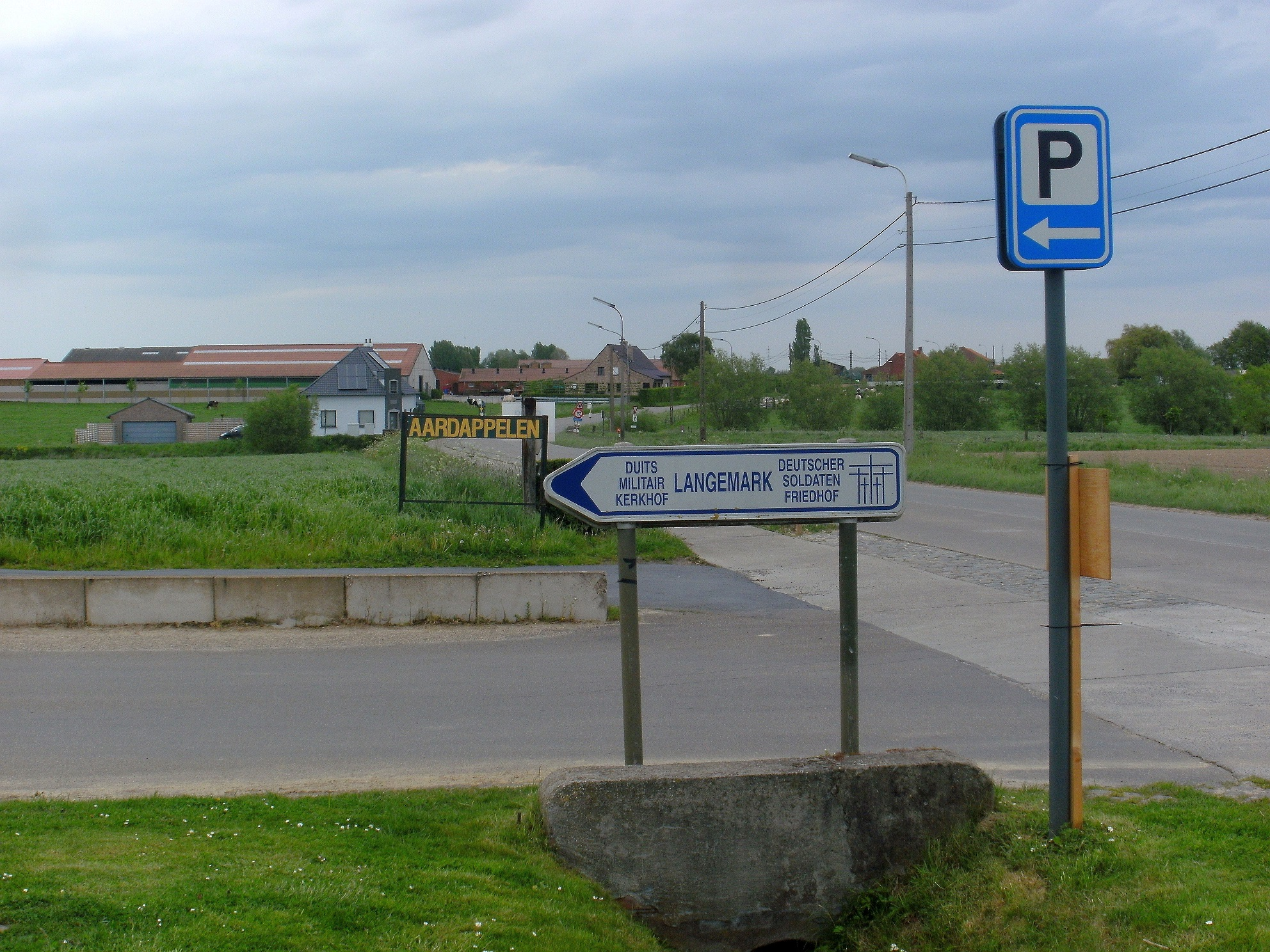

== See also ==
- Langemark German war cemetery
