= Deceuninck =

Belgian entrepreneurial family

Deceuninck NV
- Type: Public (Euronext: DECB)
- ISIN: BE0003789063
- Founded: 1937
- Headquarters: Hooglede-Gits, Belgium
- Key people: Francis Van Eeckhout (CEO)
- Products: Plastic and composite window and door systems, outdoor applications, roof and facade profiles and interior applications.
- Number of employees: 3,938 (2023)
- Website: Deceuninck website

Deceuninck is the name of an entrepreneurial family from West Flanders, Belgium, who founded several companies with their name. In 1985, the company went public on the Brussels Stock Exchange (now Euronext Brussels).

Founded in 1937, with its headquarters in Hooglede-Gits, the Deceuninck Group operates in over 90 countries and has subsidiaries across Europe, North America and Asia, including the United States, United Kingdom, Russia and Turkey. It was listed on the Brussels Stock Exchange in 1985.

== Cycling ==
Deceuninck currently sponsors Alpecin–Deceuninck and Fenix-Deceuninck, two Belgian UCI WorldTeam cycling teams. This includes sponsoring the mountain bike and cyclocross teams and nurturing both young talent and female cyclists. Headed by Mathieu van der Poel, the team primarily focuses on success in the spring classics. Yet, with sprinters like Jasper Philipsen, the team also aspires to capture stage wins in the Grand Tours. From 2019-2021 they co-sponsored the Deceuninck–Quick-Step team.
