= Harold Hippisley =

English cricketer

Personal information
- Full name: Harold Edwin Hippisley
- Born: 3 September 1890; Wells, Somerset, England
- Died: 23 October 1914 (aged 24); Langemarck, Belgium
- Batting: Right-handed
- Bowling: Unknown
- Role: Batsman

Domestic team information
- Years: Team
- 1909–13: Somerset
- First-class debut: 23 August 1909 Somerset v Worcestershire
- Last First-class: 16 July 1913 Somerset v Derbyshire

Career statistics
Competition	First-class
Matches	7
Runs scored	114
Batting average	9.50
100s/50s	–/–
Top score	40*
Balls bowled	–
Wickets	–
Bowling average	–
5 wickets in innings	–
10 wickets in match	–
Best bowling	–
Catches/stumpings	2/–
- Source: CricketArchive, 18 January 2011

Harold Edwin Hippisley (3 September 1890 – 23 October 1914) played first-class cricket for Somerset from 1909 to 1913. He was born at Wells, Somerset and died in the First World War fighting at Langemarck, Belgium.

Hippisley was educated at King's School, Bruton where he was captain of cricket, hockey and football. As a cricketer, he was "a forceful batsman, a cunning bowler and a fine fielder". He joined his King's Bruton team-mate Leonard Sutton in the Somerset side late in the 1909 season and in his first match, playing against Worcestershire and batting at number 9, he made an unbeaten 40, which proved to be his highest first-class score. He played in seven times in total for Somerset and had only one other successful match: against Northamptonshire in 1913 he made 14 and 36, though Somerset lost the game heavily. He did not bowl in first-class cricket. In minor cricket, he scored 150 in an innings for the Old Brutonians team against Sidmouth in 1911, sharing a third-wicket partnership of 396 with Percy Vasey, who made 282.

Hippisley also continued with his hockey career after school: he played for Somerset and for West of England sides and in December 1913, he was selected for a trial match for the England hockey team, though he did not win an international cap.

Hippisley was commissioned as a second lieutenant in the first battalion of the Gloucestershire Regiment in 1914, and was fatally shot in the forehead at Langemarck just 11 weeks after the war started. He had been married on the day that his regiment set sail for France.
