= Hooglede =

- Municipality
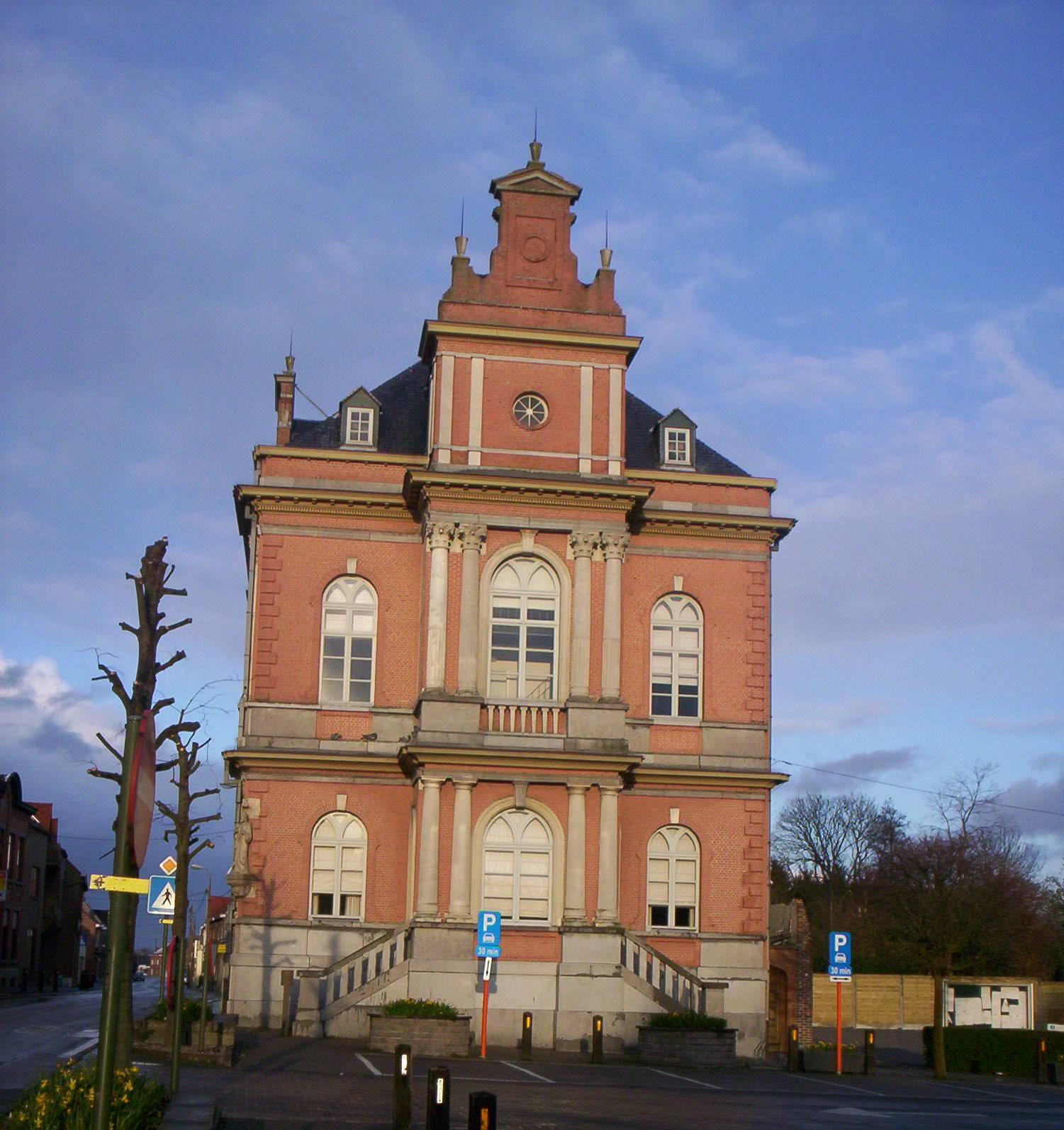
- Hooglede town hall

- Flag Coat of arms

- Location of Hooglede in West Flanders
- Interactive map of Hooglede
- Location in Belgium
- Coordinates: 50°59′N 03°05′E
- Country: Belgium
- Community: Flemish Community
- Region: Flemish Region
- Province: West Flanders
- Arrondissement: Roeselare

Government
  - Mayor: Rita Demaré (CD&V)
  - Governing parties: CD&V, Allen 8830

Area
  - Total: 38.11 km^{2} (14.71 sq mi)

Population (2018-01-01)
  - Total: 9,950
  - Density: 261/km^{2} (676/sq mi)
- Postal codes: 8830
- NIS code: 36006
- Area codes: 051
- Website: www.hooglede.be

Hooglede (Dutch pronunciation: [ˈɦoːxˌleːdə]; West Flemish: Ooglee) is a municipality located in the Belgian province of West Flanders. The municipality comprises the towns of Gits and Hooglede proper. On January 1, 2006, Hooglede had a total population of 9,831. The total area is 37.84 km^{2} which gives a population density of 260 inhabitants per km^{2}.

Hooglede-Gits was the site of the 2007 UCI Cyclo-cross World Championships. Hooglede houses one of the 4 German War Cemeteries in Belgium, the Hooglede German War Cemetery.

== Economy ==
The Deceuninck company is based in Hooglede, as is MOL Trucks.

== Politics ==
From 1989 till 2012, politics in Hooglede were dominated by the cartel SAMEN (consisting of sp.a, N-VA and Open Vld). In 2012, the cooperation within SAMEN was stopped. The new municipality consists of N-VA Plus (10 seats), CD&V (7 seats), Open Vld (2 seats) and Samen Sterk (2 seats). Mayor is Rita Demaré (CD&V).
