= Percy Vasey =

English cricketer

Personal information
- Full name: Percy Walter Vasey
- Born: 29 July 1883; Highbury, London, England
- Died: 11 September 1952 (aged 69); Upton Hellions, Crediton, Devon, England]
- Batting: Right-handed
- Bowling: Right-arm slow
- Role: Batsman
- Relatives: George Vasey (brother)

Domestic team information
- Years: Team
- 1913: Somerset
- Only FC: 19 May 1913 Somerset v Yorkshire

Career statistics
Competition	First-class
Matches	1
Runs scored	13
Batting average	6.50
100s/50s	0/0
Top score	10
Catches/stumpings	0/–
- Source: CricketArchive, 19 January 2011

Percy Walter Vasey (29 July 1883 – 11 September 1952) played first-class cricket in one match for Somerset in the 1913 season. In the 1900s, he had played Minor Counties cricket for Hertfordshire. He was born at Highbury, London and died at Upton Hellions, Crediton, Devon.

Educated at the Merchant Taylors' School, Northwood, Vasey became a schoolmaster at King's School, Bruton. Unusually to modern eyes, he was a successful member of the school hockey and cricket teams and a reproduction in 2008 of the 1908 edition of The Dolphin, the King's Bruton school magazine, shows a fair-haired mustachioed man as a member of both the unbeaten football team and as a gown-wearing teacher in the school photograph. Vasey returned to King's Bruton as a master after the First World War and was a housemaster.

As a cricketer, Vasey was a right-handed middle-order batsman and a right-arm slow bowler, though he did not bowl in either Minor Counties or first-class cricket. He played twice for Hertfordshire in 1906, making 31 in the innings victory over Oxfordshire. In minor cricket in 1911, he scored 282 for the Old Brutonians team against Sidmouth, sharing a third-wicket partnership of 396 with Harold Hippisley, who made 150. His only first-class match, in which Hippisley also played, came in 1913, where Vasey made 10 and 3 against Yorkshire at Bath. As late as 1931 he was playing for Old Brutonians in club matches.

Vasey served in the First World War with the Dorset Regiment; he was transferred from active service to the Ministry of National Service in 1917 with the rank of captain.
