= Langemark =

Langemark, West-Vlaanderen, Belgium
- Deelgemeente
- Langemark, West-Vlaanderen, Belgium
- Coordinates: 50°54′48″N 2°55′05″E
- Country: Belgium
- Province: West Flanders
- Municipality: Langemark-Poelkapelle

Area
  - Total: 31.67 km^{2} (12.23 sq mi)

Population (1999)
  - Total: 5,084
- Source: NIS
- Postal code: 8920

Langemark is a village in the Belgian province of West Flanders, and a subdivision of the municipality of Langemark-Poelkapelle. The village has about 5,000 inhabitants. Besides the village center, there are also three smaller hamlets on the territory, Madonna, Bikschote and Saint-Julien/Sint-Juliaan.

Written as Langemarck on Belgian, French, British and German maps, the village is known in military history as the scene (see trench map) of the first gas attacks by the German army in the western front, which marked the beginning of the Second Battle of Ypres in April 1915.

Before and during the First Battle of Ypres, the German reserve corps suffered enormous losses: over 10,000 young soldiers (some only 15 years old), led by young officers without practical experience, died without achieving any objective. On 10 November 1914, about 2,000 soldiers died during an attempted breakthrough. One day later, the German Command (Oberste Heeresleitung) published the following communiqué:

Westlich Langemarck brachen junge Regimenter unter dem Gesange‚ Deutschland, Deutschland über alles‘ gegen die erste Linie der feindlichen Stellungen vor und nahmen sie. Etwa 2.000 Mann französischer Linieninfanterie wurden gefangengenommen und sechs Maschinengewehre erbeutet.

In west Langemarck, youth regiments singing Germany, Germany Above All advanced on front line enemy positions, broke and took them. Approximately 2,000 French line infantry and six machine guns were captured.

A popular and enduring myth of heroic self-sacrifice for the nation (known as the "Myth of Langemarck) arose from the propagandistic story. For this reason, the Flemish division of the Waffen-SS was named 27th SS Volunteer Division Langemarck.

The village was destroyed during World War I. There is now a major German war cemetery, the Langemark German war cemetery, (Soldatenfriedhof) in this location, which has about 40,000 burials.

== See also ==
- 27th SS Volunteer Division Langemarck
- Battle of Langemarck (1917)
- Saint Julien Memorial, to Canadian soldiers of World War I

== Gallery ==
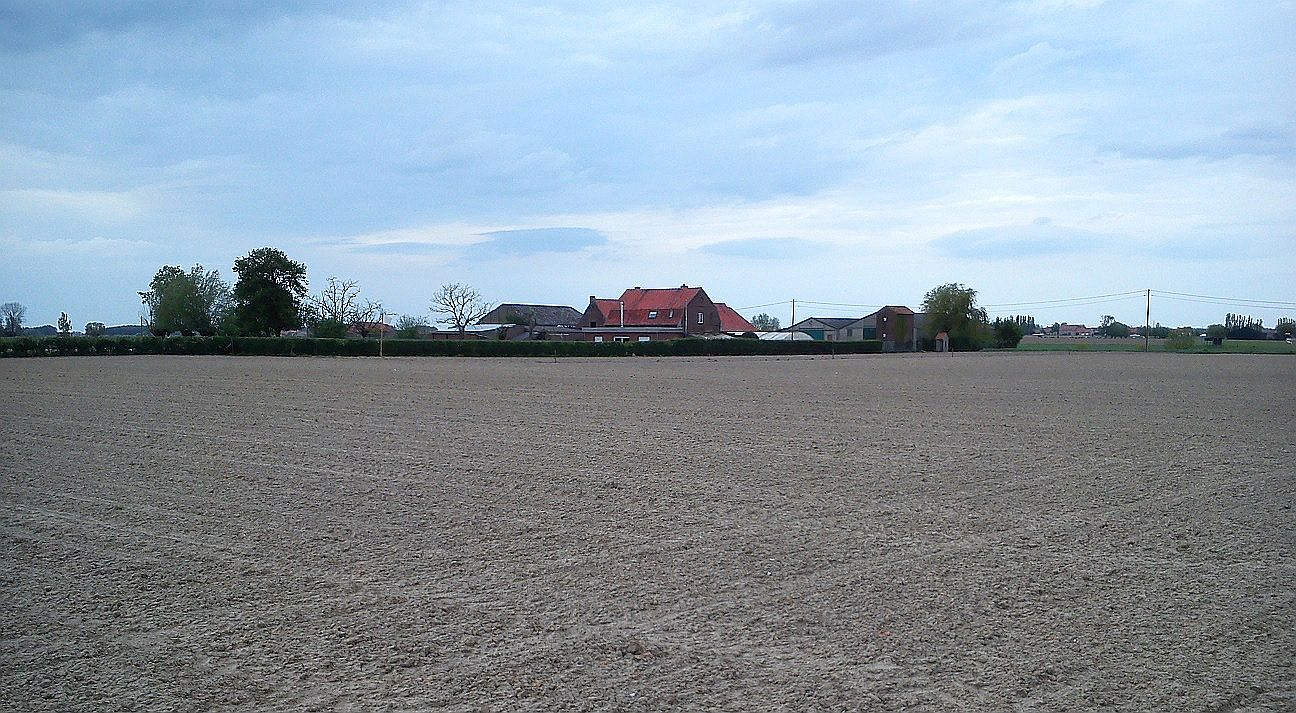
Farm at Langemark

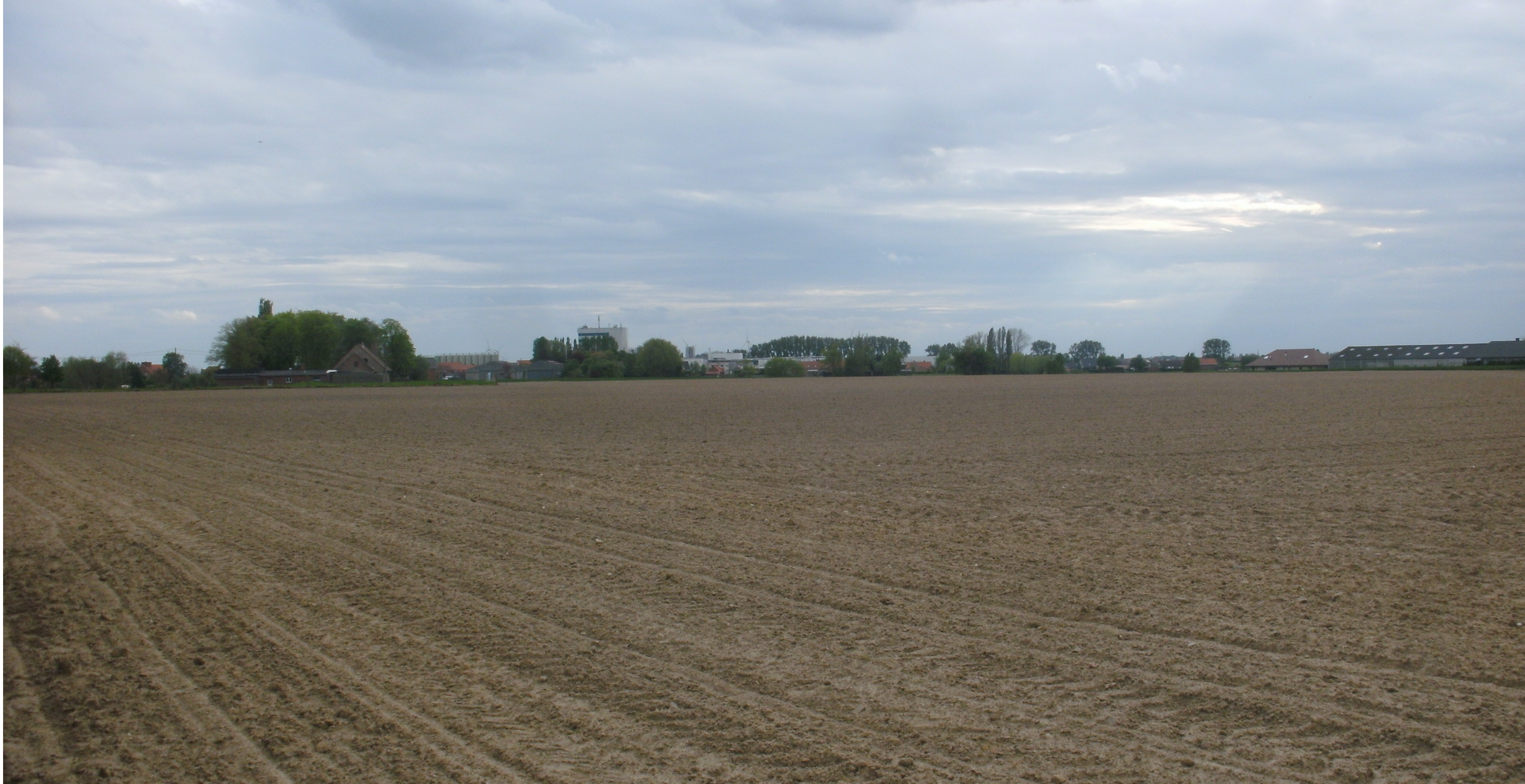
Fields at Langemark

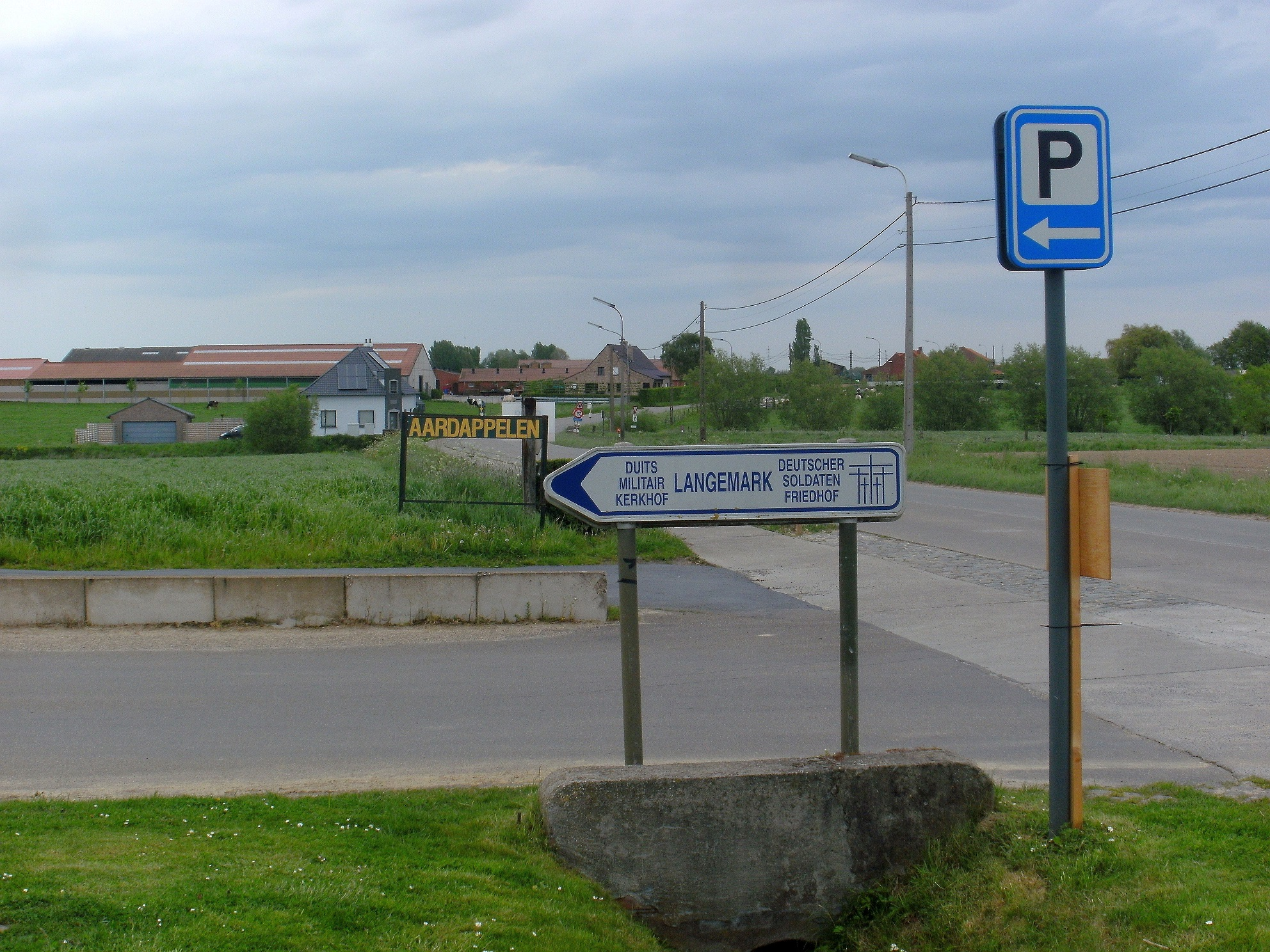

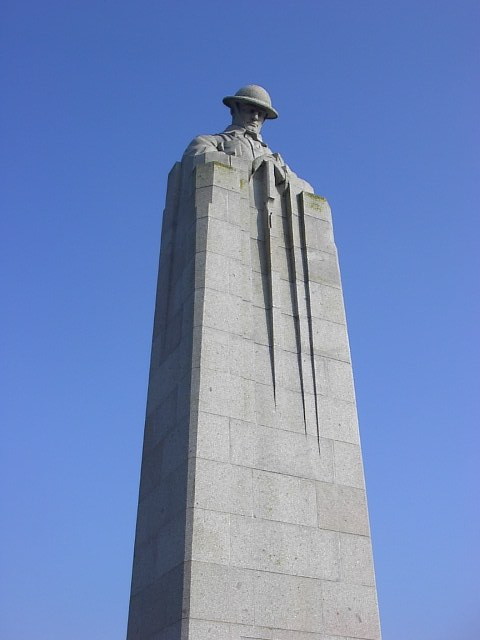
Monument for the World War I soldiers from Canada. The Brooding Soldier in Langemark

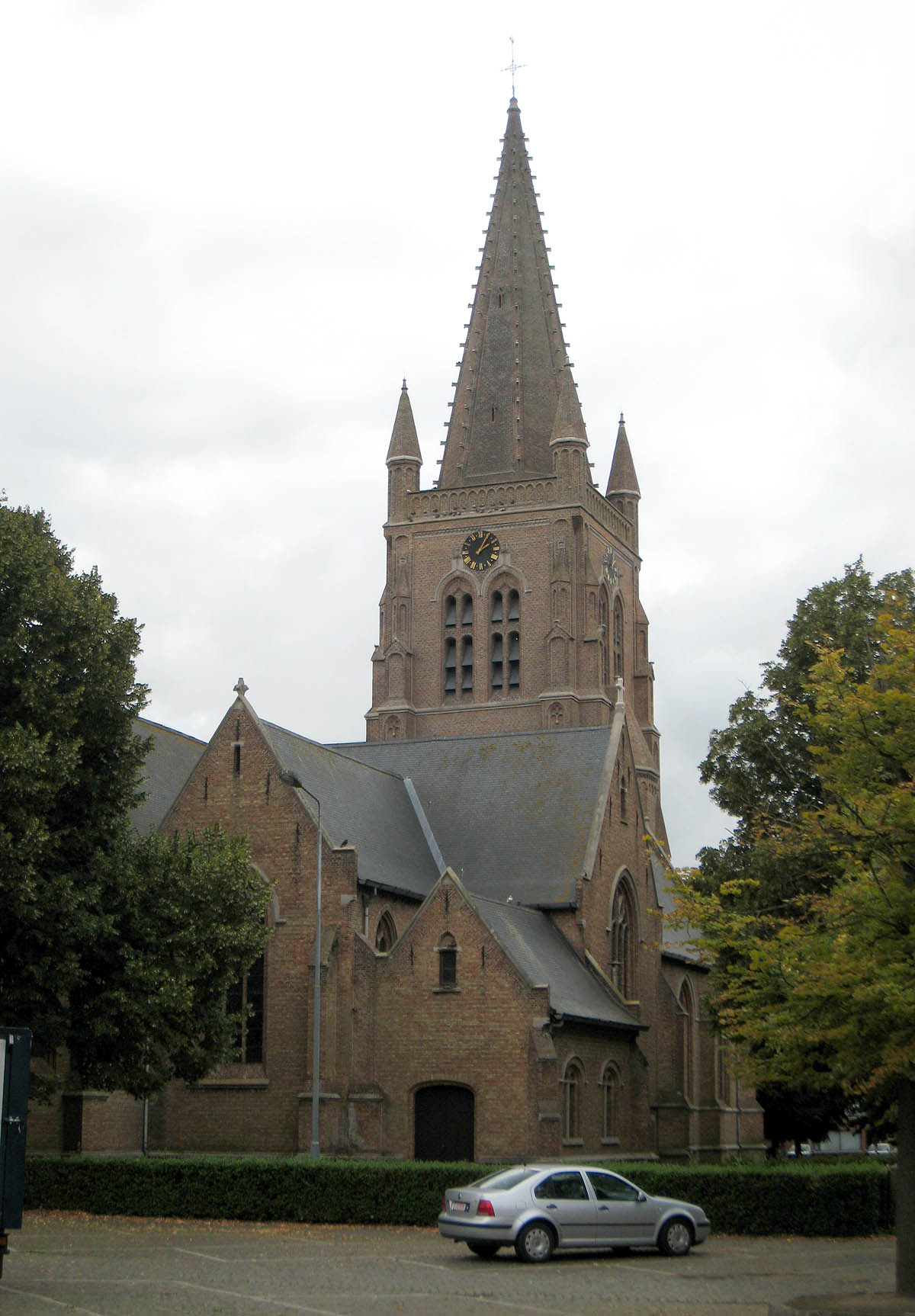
The church in Langemark

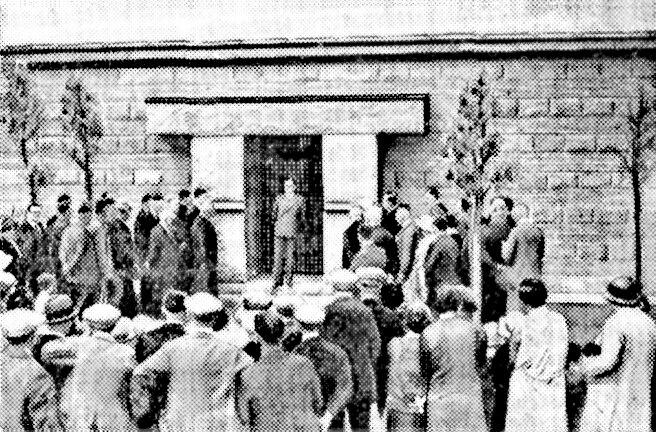
Sacred hour at the monument of Langemarck (10 July 1932)
