= John Hippisley =

John Hippisley may refer to

- John Hippisley (1530–1570), MP for Wells and Bridport
- John Hippisley (Parliamentarian) (fl. 1617–1653), English MP for Petersfield, Dover and Cockermouth
- Sir John Hippisley, 1st Baronet (c.1746–1825), English MP for Sudbury
- John Hippisley (actor), English comic actor and playwright
