= George Vasey (cricketer) =

English cricketer (1880–1951)

Personal information
- Full name: George Herbert Vasey
- Born: 3 October 1880; Islington, Middlesex, England
- Died: 13 June 1951 (aged 70); Norwich, Norfolk, England
- Batting: Unknown
- Bowling: Unknown
- Relatives: Percy Vasey (brother)

Domestic team information
- Years: Team
- 1906–1924: Hertfordshire
- 1917/18–1918/19: Europeans

Career statistics
Competition	First-class
Matches	4
Runs scored	238
Batting average	34.00
100s/50s	1/1
Top score	115
Balls bowled	420
Wickets	9
Bowling average	21.33
5 wickets in innings	1
10 wickets in match	–
Best bowling	5/50
Catches/stumpings	–/–
- Source: ESPNcricinfo, 7 July 2019

George Herbert Vasey (3 October 1880 – 13 June 1951) was an English first-class cricketer and educator.

Vasey was born at Islington in October 1880 and was educated at the Merchant Taylors' School. He was later employed as an assistant master by Aldenham School, where he served as a second lieutenant with the school contingent of the Officers' Training Corps. He made his debut in minor counties cricket for Hertfordshire against Buckinghamshire in the 1906 Minor Counties Championship.

He served in the First World War with the Dorset Regiment, during which he was promoted to the rank of lieutenant in December 1914. While serving during the war in British India, he made his debut in first-class cricket for the Europeans cricket team against the Parsees in the 1917–18 Bombay Quadrangular at Bombay. He made three further first-class appearances for the Europeans, the last of which came in 1918–19 Bombay Quadrangular. He also played in the first-class 'victory match' for England against India in November 1918, shortly after the signing of the Armistice. He scored 238 runs at an average of 34.00 in his four first-class matches. His top-score of 115 came against the Indians in January 1918. With the ball, he took 9 wickets (all for the Europeans) at a bowling average of 18.66, with best figures of 5 for 88 on debut against the Parsees.

Following the war, he resumed playing minor counties cricket for Hertfordshire until 1924. He also resumed his teaching career at Aldenham School, retiring in July 1944. Vasey died at Norwich in June 1951. His brother, Percy, also played first-class cricket.
