= Langemark German war cemetery =

Cemetery in West Flanders, Belgium

- German War Graves Commission; Volksbund Deutsche Kriegsgräberfürsorge.
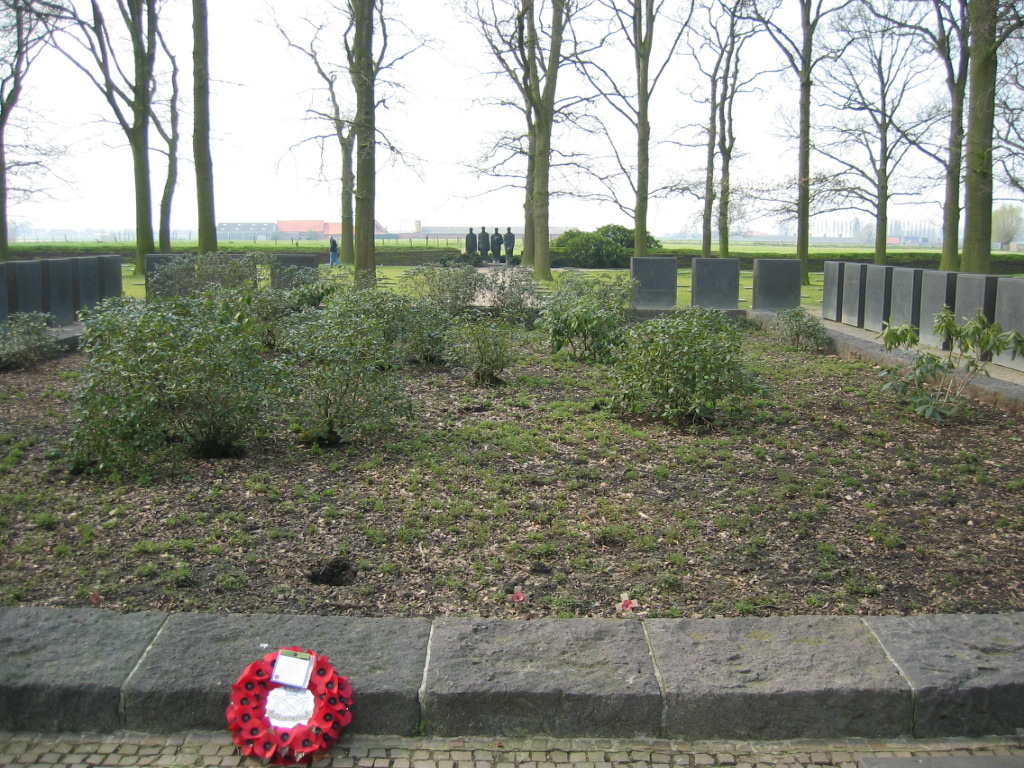
- This mass grave contains 24,917 soldiers of whom 7,977 remain unknown. The names of those known are on the surrounding upright basalt blocks.
- Used for those deceased 1915–1918
- Established: 1915
- Location: 50°55′14″N 2°55′0″E near Langemark-Poelkapelle
- Total burials: 10,143 + ca. 9,470 (graves); 24,917 (mass grave)
- Unknowns: 3,836 (graves); 7,977 (mass grave)

Burials by nation
- Imperial Germany Great Britain

Burials by war
- World War I

UNESCO World Heritage Site
- Official name: Funerary and memory sites of the First World War (Western Front)
- Type: Cultural
- Criteria: i, ii, vi
- Designated: 2023 (45th session)
- Reference no.: 1567-FL06

The German war cemetery of Langemark (formerly spelt 'Langemarck') is near the village of Langemark, part of the municipality of Langemark-Poelkapelle, in the Belgian province of West Flanders. More than 44,000 soldiers are buried here. The village was the scene of the first poison gas attacks by the Imperial German Army in the Western Front (see trench map), marking the beginning of the Second Battle of Ypres in April 1915.

During the First Battle of Ypres (1914) in World War I, poorly trained and inexperienced German infantrymen suffered severe casualties when they made a futile frontal attack on allied positions near Langemark and were checked by experienced French Poilus and British Tommies. Fifteen percent of the German soldiers involved in the Battle of Langemark were schoolboys or students, some as young as 15 years old. The original communiqué sent out as propaganda stated that the German infantry had been singing the first stanza of what later (1919) became the national anthem of the Weimar Republic; "Deutschland, Deutschland über alles", as they charged.

The cemetery, which evolved from a small group of graves from 1915, has seen numerous changes and extensions. It was dedicated in 1932. Today, visitors find a mass grave near the entrance. This comrades' grave contains 24,917 servicemen, including the World War I flying ace Werner Voss. Between the oak trees, next to this mass grave, are another 10,143 soldiers (including 2 British soldiers killed in 1918). The 3,000 school students who were killed during the First Battle of Ypres are buried in a third part of the cemetery. At the front of the cemetery is a sculpture of four mourning figures by Professor Emil Krieger. The group was added in 1956, and is said to stand guard over the fallen. The cemetery is maintained by the German War Graves Commission, the Volksbund Deutsche Kriegsgräberfürsorge.

In September 2008, last British Army World War I combat veteran Harry Patch visited the Langemark cemetery and laid a memorial wreath on the grave of an Imperial German Army soldier who was killed in action on 16 August 1917; the day Private Patch's Division had attacked and taken the village of Langemarck during the Battle of Passchendaele. Noticing three acorns nesting beside the German soldier's gravestone, Patch picked them up, brought them back to England, and planted the acorns beside the Fletcher House nursing home, where he lived in Wells, Somerset.

On 22 May 2009, an all-Flemish band performed the traditional German soldiers' lament Ich hatt' einen Kameraden on the Great Highland bagpipes and drums during a joint Belgian, British, and German memorial ceremony at the Langemark German war cemetery. Afterwards, the attendees socialized peacefully together at a nearby village pub.

== Gallery ==
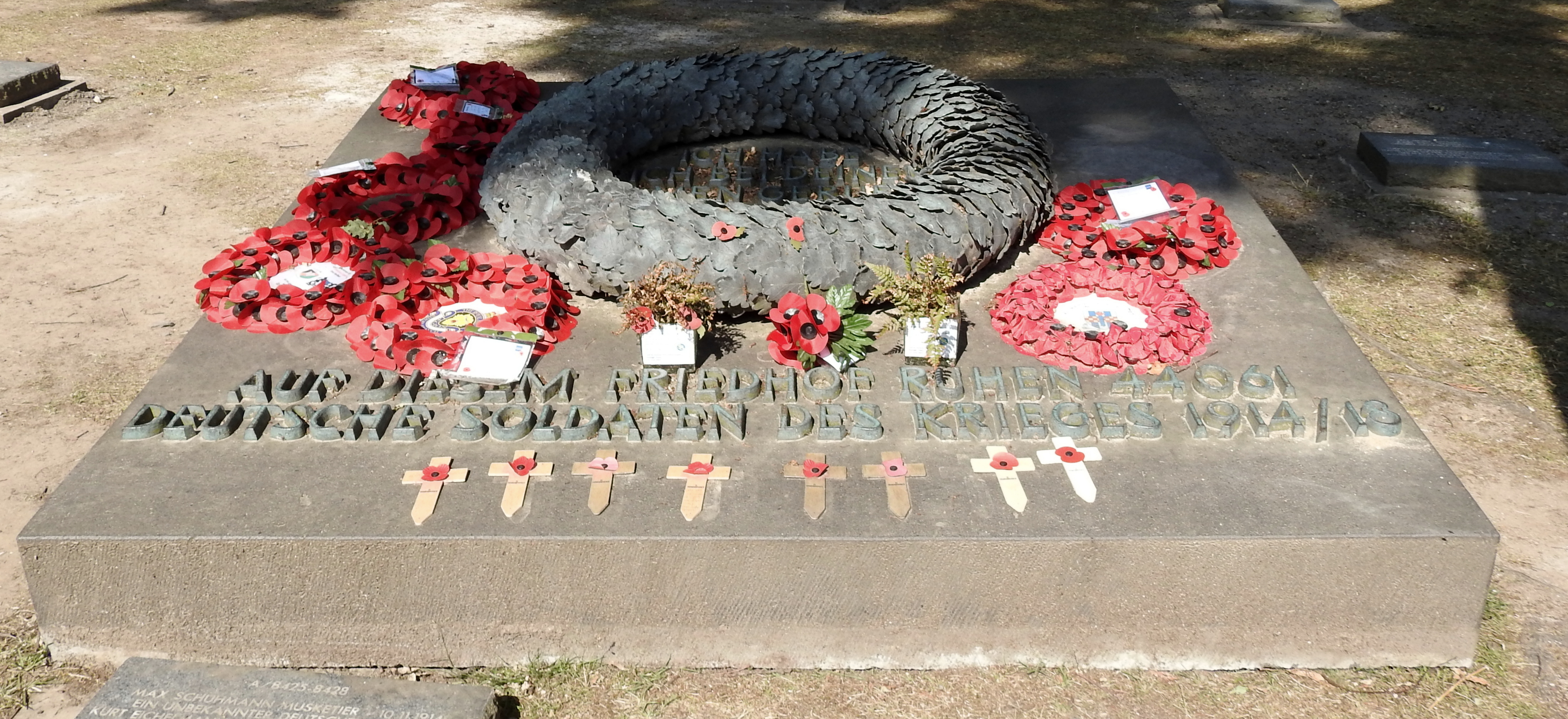
This wreath marks the largest mass grave.

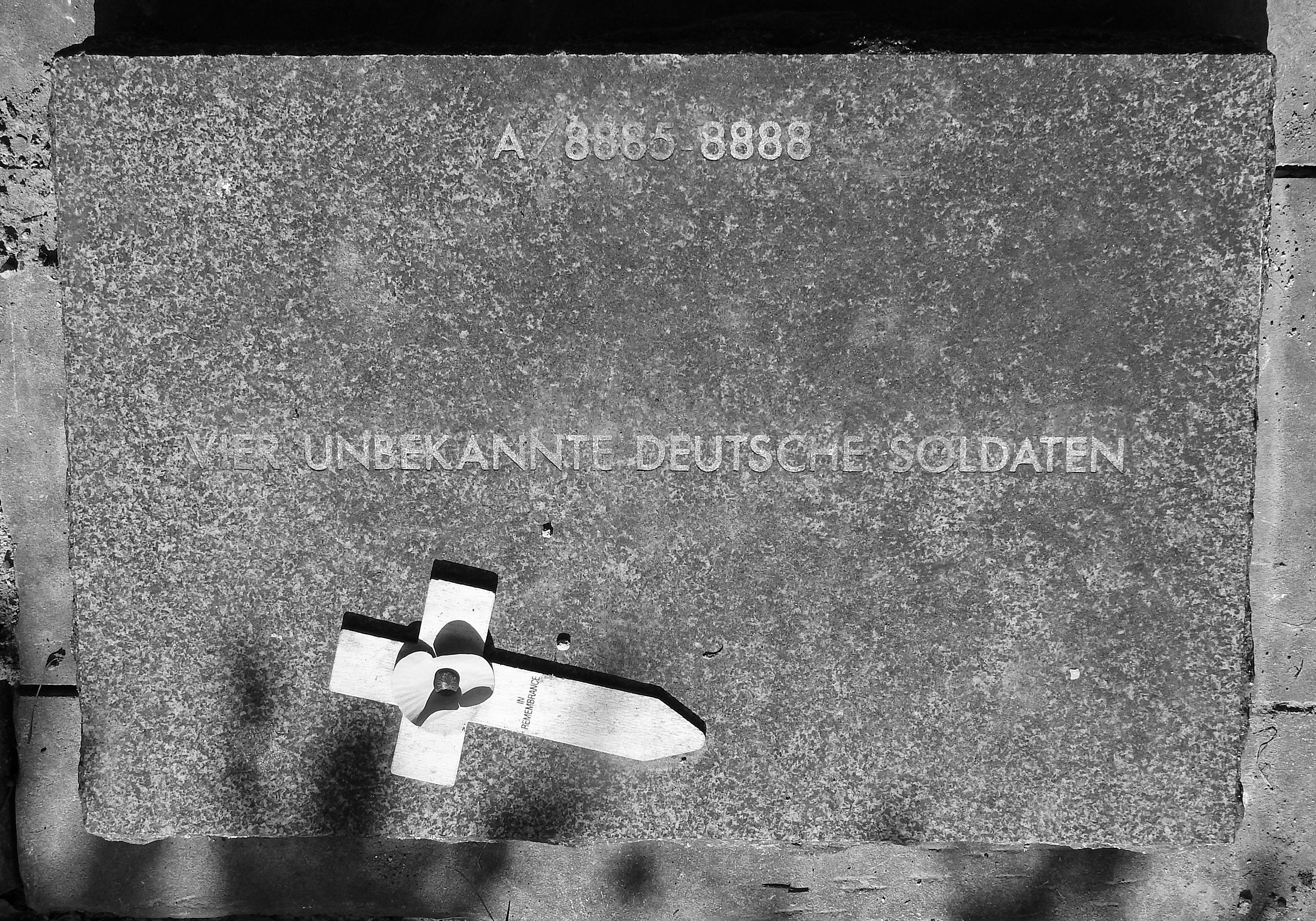
Individual marker of four unknown soldiers.

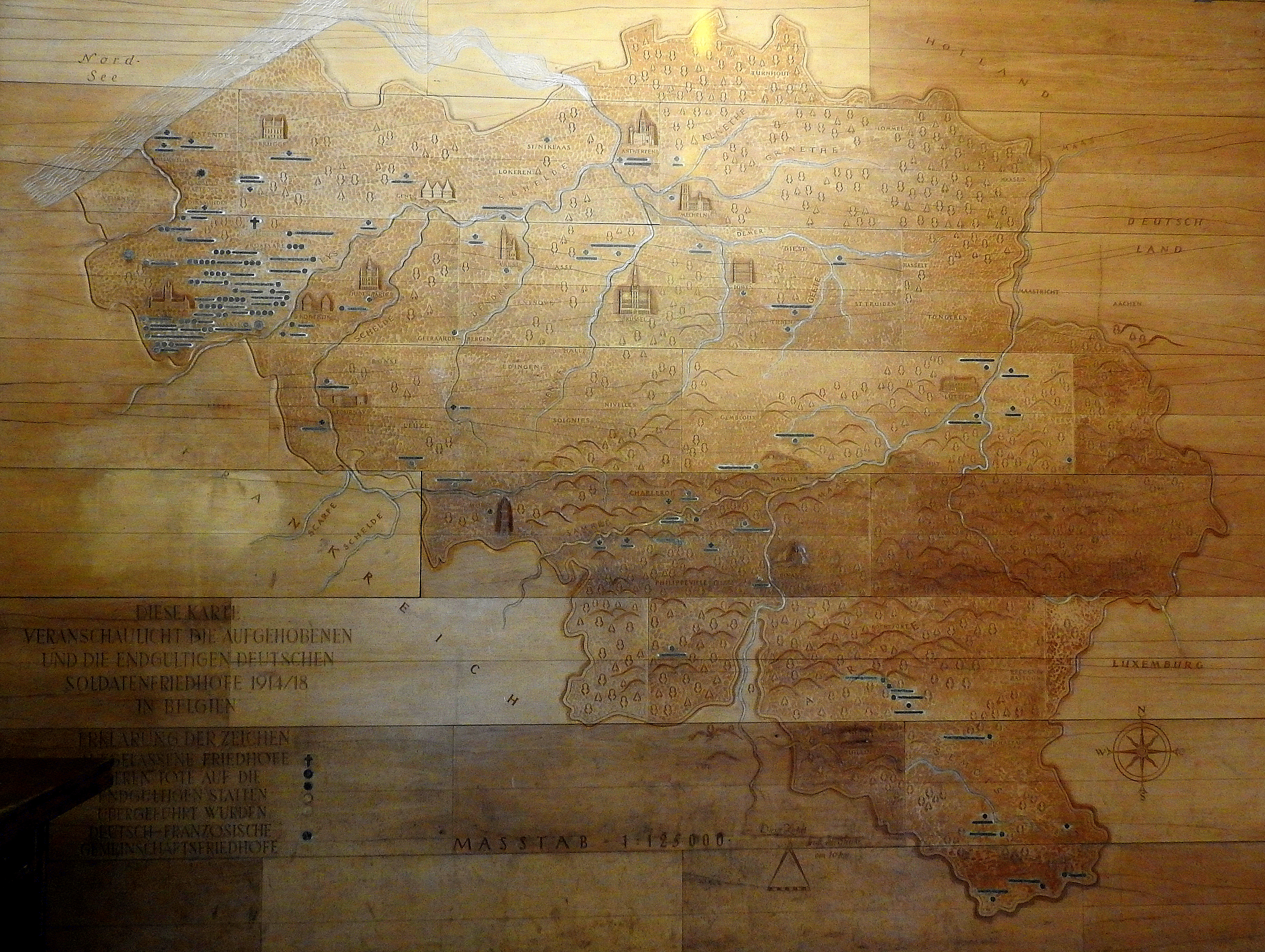
This map is a key to World War I German soldier burial sites in Belgium, located in the entrance block.

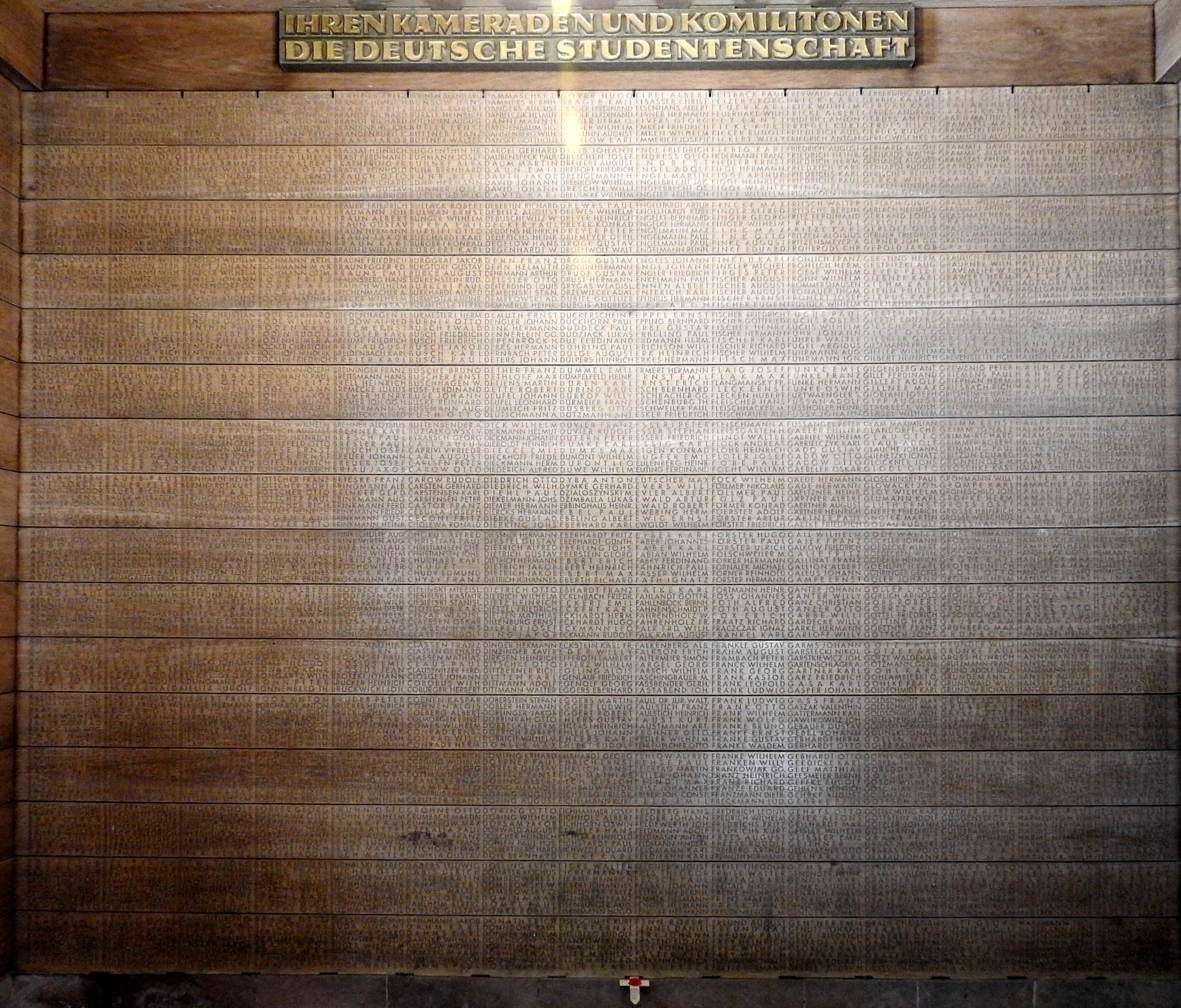
One wall listing the names of the 3,000 German students killed during the First Battle of Ypres, inside the entrance block.

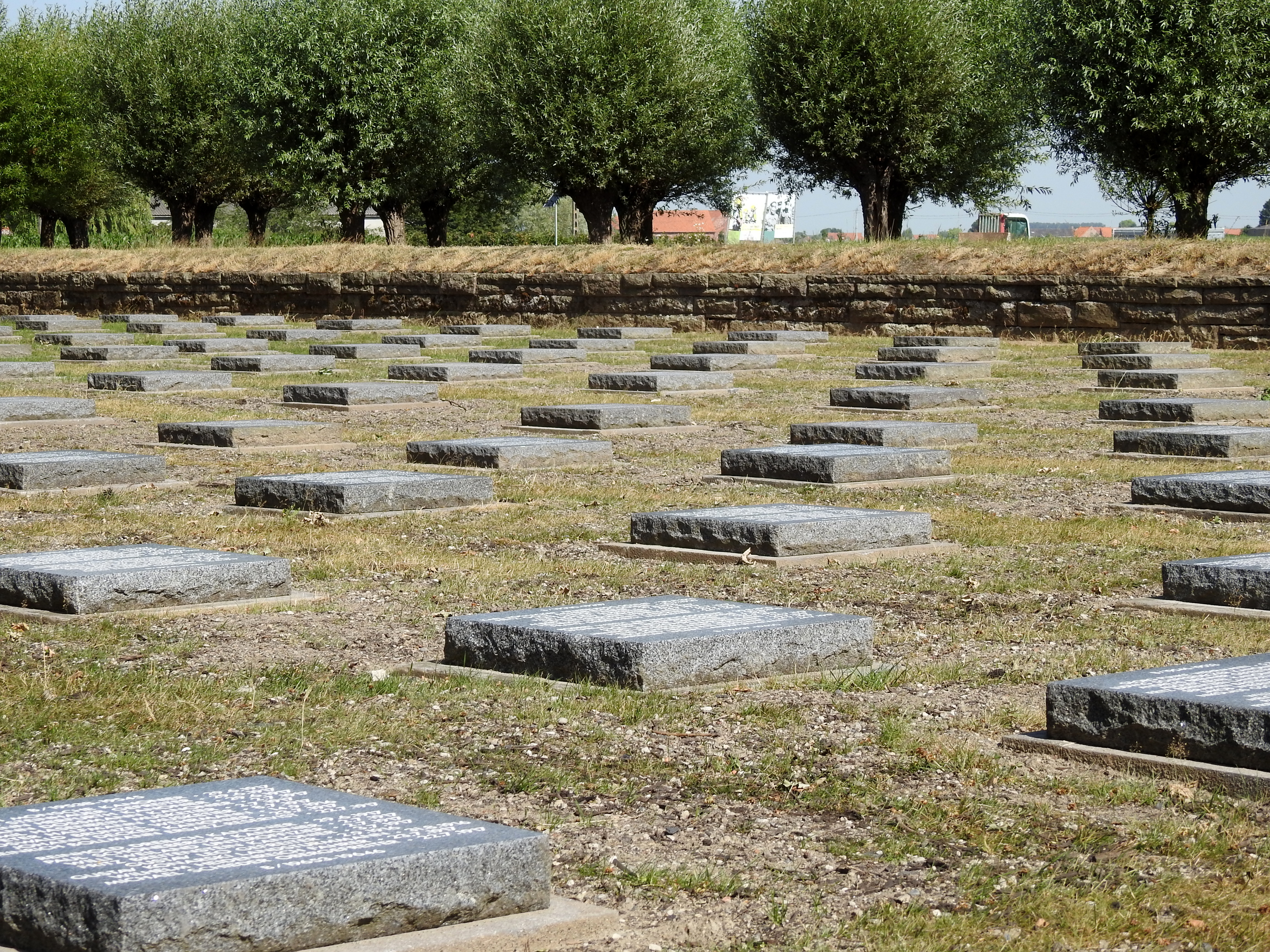
Flat grave markers.

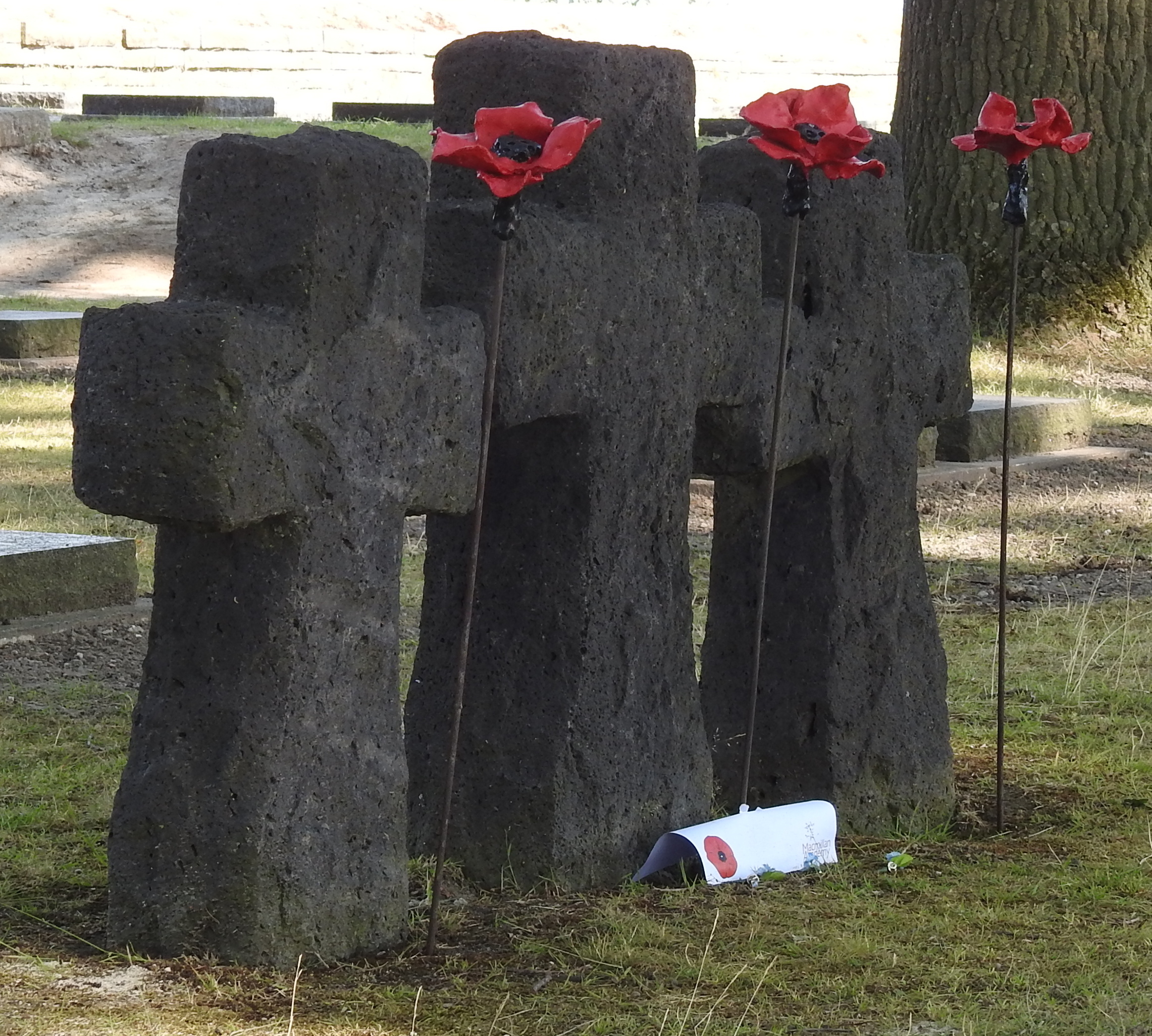
For the 100th anniversary commemoration of World War I, many cemeteries and other sites have had ceramic poppies installed.

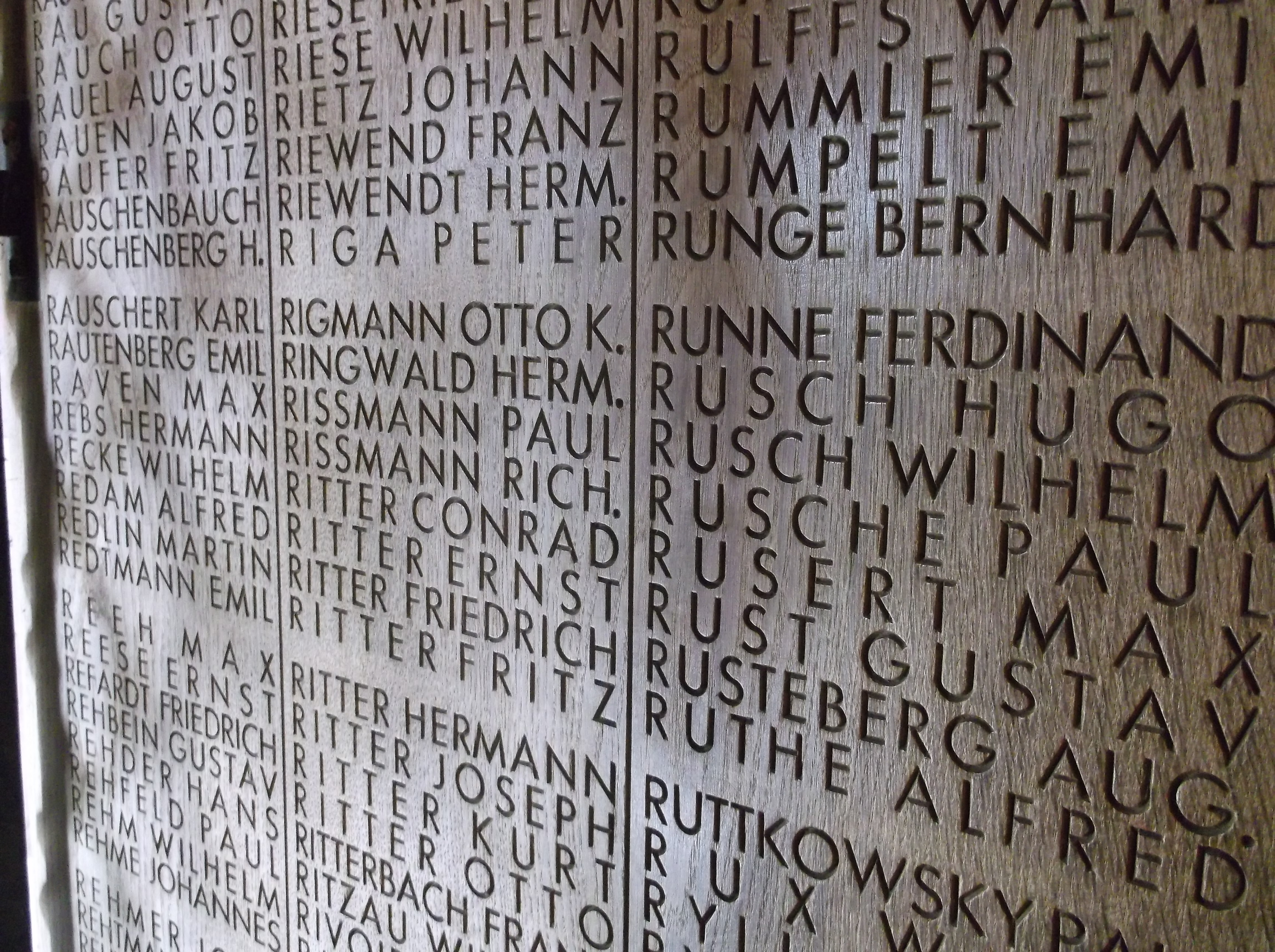
A section of the memorial wall to the victims of the massacre of the Innocents.

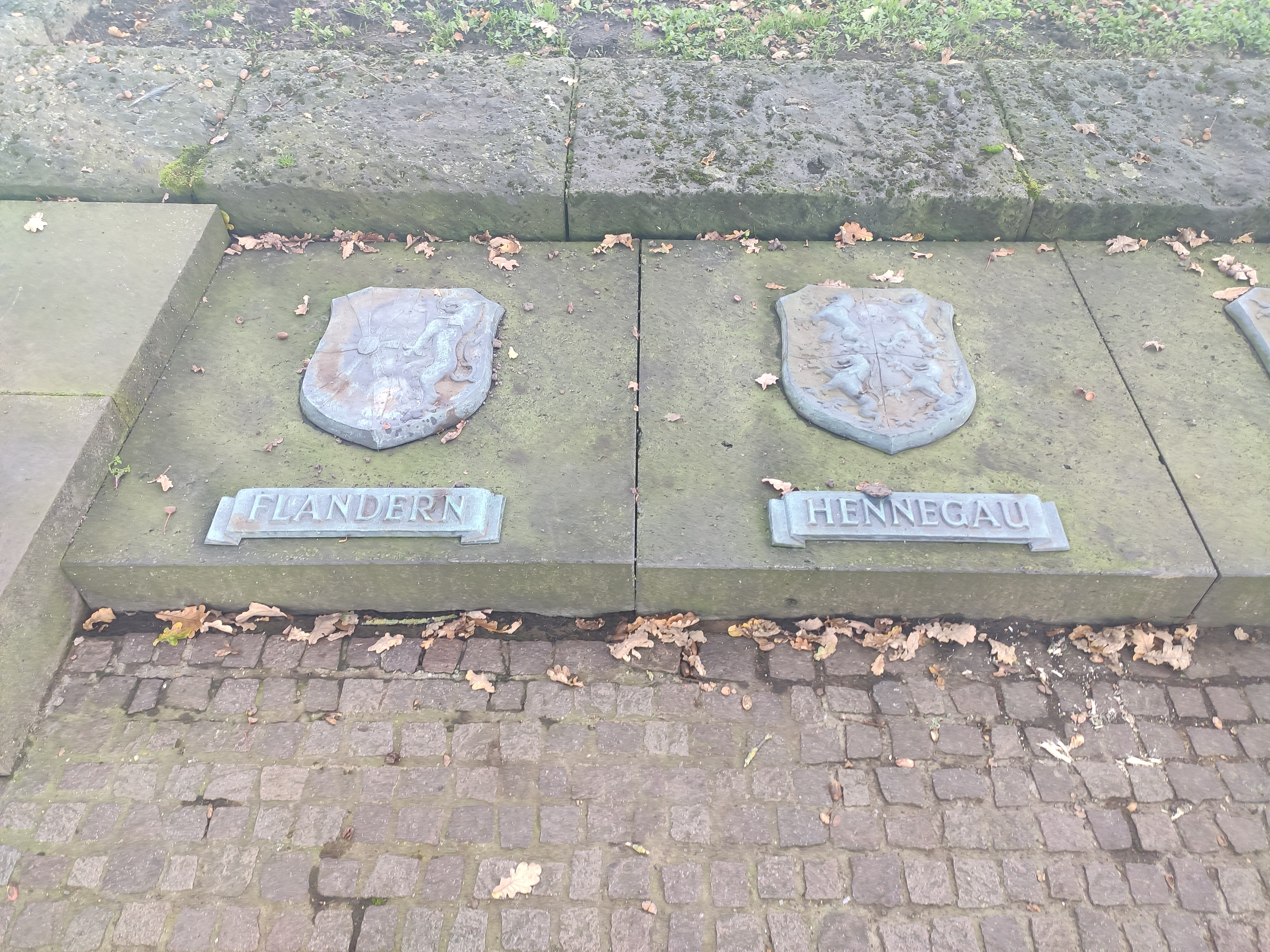
2 plaques in the Langemark German cemetery
