= Canadian war memorials =

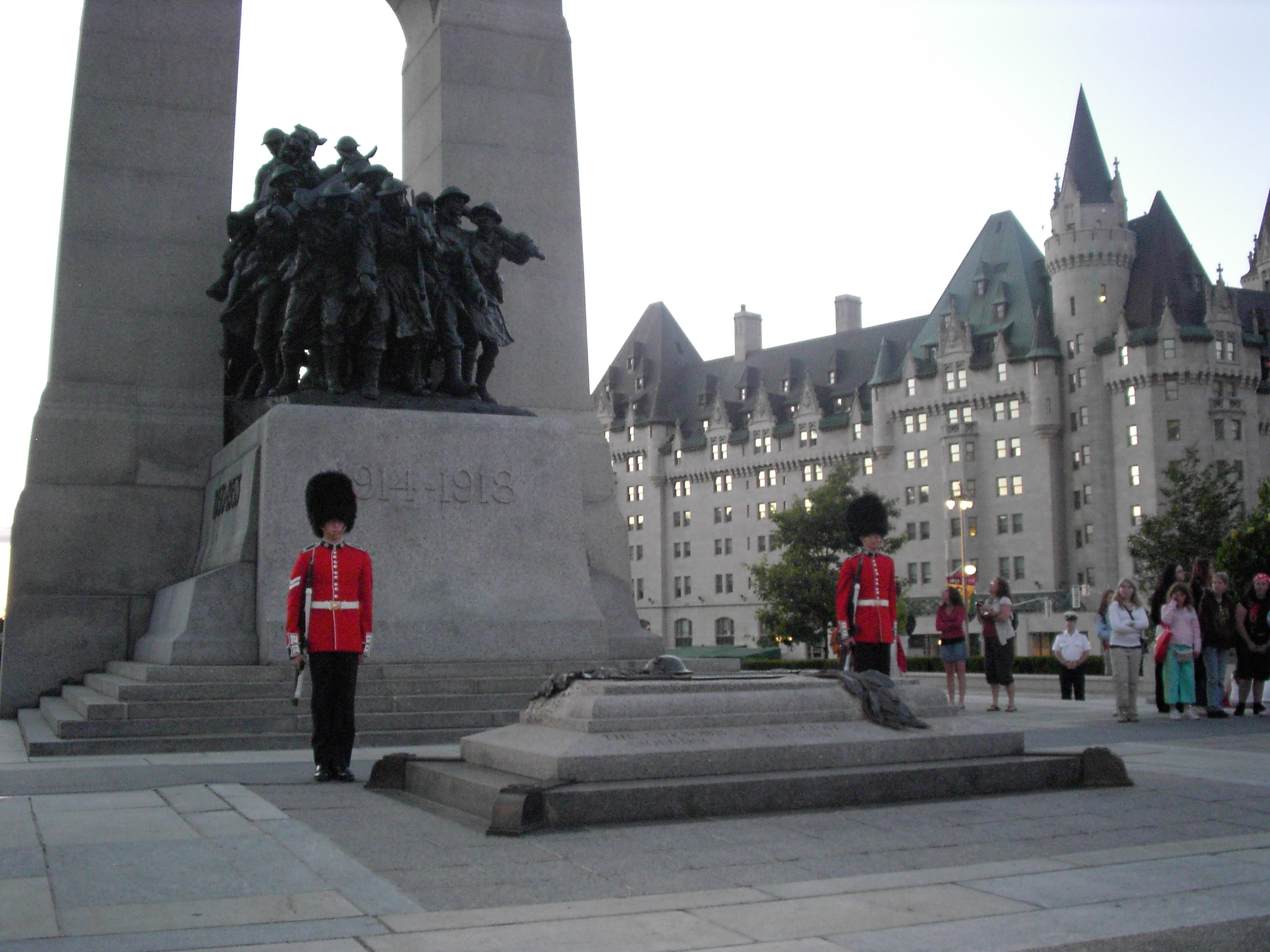
Ceremonial Guard stand watch over Canada's national memorial, The Response, with the Tomb of the Unknown Soldier in the foreground

Canadian war memorials are buildings, monuments, and statues that commemorate the armed actions in the territory encompassing modern Canada, the role of the Canadian military in conflicts and peacekeeping operations, and Canadians who died or were injured in a war. Much of this military history of Canada is commemorated today with memorials across the country and around the world. Canadian memorials commemorate the sacrifices made as early as the Seven Years' War to the modern day war on terror. As Newfoundland was a British Dominion until joining Confederation in 1949, there are several monuments in Newfoundland and Labrador and abroad which were dedicated to Newfoundland servicemen and women.

There are currently over 6,000 war memorials in Canada registered with the National Inventory of Military Memorials, which is under the Canadian Department of Veterans Affairs. There are also war memorials across the world, some of which are operated by the Commonwealth War Graves Commission, which are dedicated to Canada as well as the Commonwealth members. There currently are 17 in France, six in Belgium, four in the United Kingdom, two in Afghanistan and South Korea, and one each in Egypt, Hong Kong, Italy, Malta, the Netherlands, Singapore, Turkey, and the United Arab Emirates.

There are few examples of memorial art created by Indigenous peoples before the late nineteenth century. One of the best-preserved memorials is in Áísínai’pi, or Writing-on-Stone Provincial Park, in southern Alberta. This UNESCO World Heritage Site houses an extensive series of small-scale petroglyphs incised on the sandstone bluffs of the Milk River, a number of them dating to thousands of years ago.

== War memorials in Canada ==
=== Colonial period ===
There exists a number of memorials commemorating events that occurred prior to Canadian Confederation in 1867. In addition to pre-Confederation war memorials, a number of communities in Ontario also have cannons originating from the Crimean War. However, these cannons are war trophies gifted to various communities in Upper Canada after the conflict; and do not serve as a memorial. Prior to the twentieth century, Canadian memorials were dedicated to great leaders and victories, not the named deaths of ordinary service personnel.

Memorial name	Image	Location	Map	Notes
Battle Hill Monument		Southwest Middlesex, Ontario	42.997895°N 79.174913°W	Commemorates the Battle of Longwoods, fought during the War of 1812.
Battle of Cook's Mill Monument		Cooks Mill, Ontario	42.997895°N 79.174913°W	Commemorates the Battle of Cook's Mill, fought during the War of 1812.
Battle of Crysler's Farm Monument		Morrisburg, Ontario	42°41′39″N 81°42′18″W	Dedicated to those who fought and died in the victory at Crysler's Farm.
Battle of Eccles Hill Monument		Frelighsburg, Quebec		Commemorates the Battle of Eccles Hill, fought during the Fenian raids.
Battle of Lundy's Lane Monument		Niagara Falls, Ontario		Dedicated in 1895, the monument commemorates members of the British Army and Canadian militia during the Battle of Lundy's Lane.
Battle of Trois-Rivières Monument		Trois-Rivières, Quebec		Commemorates the British and Canadian soldiers who fought at the Battle of Trois-Rivières during the American Revolutionary War.
British Empire Loyalist Cairn		Regina, Saskatchewan		Dedicated to American settlers and the United Empire Loyalists who sided with the British during the American Revolutionary War.
Brock's Monument		Queenston, Ontario	43°09′36.37″N 079°03′10.99″W	Dedicated to Major General Isaac Brock, one of Canada's heroes of the War of 1812.
Canadian Volunteer Monument		Toronto, Ontario	43°39′45.55″N 079°23′36.01″W	Honours University of Toronto student volunteers who fell during the Battle of Ridgeway Lime Ridge, or died of wounds received in action or from disease contracted in service while defending her frontier in June 1866.
Defence of York Monument		Toronto, Ontario	43°38′34″N 079°23′01″W	In memory of officers, non-commissioned officers and men who were killed or died of wounds defending York (present-day Toronto).
James Wolfe Monument		Quebec City, Quebec	46°47′59.81″N 071°13′29.79″W	Dedicated to General James Wolfe, remembered chiefly for his victory over the French, and establishing British rule in Canada.
Liverpool Memorial Cairn		Liverpool, Nova Scotia		Highlights the role of privateers from the area during the American Revolutionary War and the War of 1812.
Monument aux Braves		Quebec City, Quebec		Commemorates the Battle of Sainte-Foy, fought during the Seven Years' War.
Peace Arch		Surrey, British Columbia	49°0′7.66″N 122°45′23.49″W	Monument commemorates the signing of the Treaty of Ghent, which ended the War of 1812. Situated on the Canada–United States border, the Arch lies between the communities of Surrey, British Columbia, and Blaine Washington.
Royal Navy and Provincial Marine Memorial		Kingston, Ontario		Dedicated to the officers and seamen of the Royal Navy and the Provincial Marine who served in Lake Ontario during the War of 1812.
Stoney Creek Battlefield Memorial		Hamilton, Ontario	43°12′59.9″N 079°45′59.4″W	Commemorates the victory at the Battle of Stoney Creek, fought during the War of 1812.
Sebastopol Monument		Halifax, Nova Scotia	44°38′36.67″N 063°34′20.93″W	Forth oldest war monument in Canada and the only Crimean War monument in North America.
United Empire Loyalist Memorial		Tusket, Nova Scotia		Dedicated to the United Empire Loyalists who settled the area during, or after the American Revolutionary War.
Wolfe and Montcalm Obelisk		Quebec City, Quebec	46°48′40″N 071°12′19″W	Oldest war monument in Canada. Commemorates Louis-Joseph de Montcalm and James Wolfe, the French and British commanders of the Battle of the Plains of Abraham during the Seven Years War.
War of 1812 Monument, Ottawa		Ottawa, Ontario		Monument commemorating diverse contributions to the defence of Canada during the War of 1812
War of 1812 Monument, Toronto		Toronto, Ontario	43°38′12″N 079°24′00″W	Commemorates the successful defence of British North America against American forces in the War of 1812

=== North-West Rebellion and the Boer War ===
Memorial name	Image	Location	Map	Notes
Boer War Memorial		Montreal, Quebec	45°29′58.63″N 073°34′15.44″W	Sculpted by George W. Hill
Boer War Memorial Fountain		Halifax, Nova Scotia		Commemorate Canadian combatants during the Second Boer War. Located in the Halifax Public Gardens
Boer War Monument		Windsor, Ontario		Unveiled in 1906, the memorial was originally situated next to a post office, and later moved to Jackson Park in 1932.
Central Memorial Park		Calgary, Alberta	51°02′28.48″N 114°04′16.00″W	The park has a cenotaph, a statue of a First World War soldier and a statue of R.L. Boyle, which is dedicated to all Albertans who served during the Second Boer War.
North-West Rebellion Monument		Toronto, Ontario	43°39′42.10″N 079°23′24.23″W	Dedicated to those who served with the Canadian army during the North-West Rebellion.
South African War Memorial		Halifax, Nova Scotia	44°38′53.86″N 063°34′24.65″W	Created by Hamilton MacCarthy
South African War Memorial		London, Ontario		Commemorates those from Middlesex County, Ontario who served during the Second Boer War. Unveiled in 1912 by the Imperial Order Daughters of the Empire; rededicated in 2000.
South African War Memorial		Ottawa, Ontario	45°25′21.84″N 075°41′31.68″W	Located in Confederation Park it commemorates the Canadian participation in the Boer War.
South African War Memorial		Quebec City, Quebec		Sculpted by Hamilton MacCarthy.
South African War Memorial		Toronto, Ontario	43°39′04.72″N 079°23′12.49″W	Commemorates the Canadian participation in the Boer War
Volunteers Monument		Winnipeg, Manitoba		Commemorates the members of the 90th Winnipeg Battalion of Rifles during the North-West Rebellion

=== First and Second World Wars ===
The war memorial sculptors at work in Canada in the years following the First World War include: Emanuel Hahn, George W. Hill, Frank Norbury, Walter Allward, Hamilton MacCarthy, Coeur de Lion MacCarthy, Alfred Howell, Sydney March, Elizabeth Wyn Wood, Henri Hebert, J. Massey Rhind, Hubert Garnier, Nicholas Pirotton, Charles Adamson, Frances Loring, and Ivor Lewis.

Memorial name	Image	Location	Map	Notes
Albert Memorial Bridge		Regina, Saskatchewan	50°26′10.2012″N 104°37′5.3544″W	Honours Saskatchewan soldiers who died in World War I.
Animals in War Memorial / Les animaux en temps de guerre		Ottawa, Ontario	45°25′21.84″N 075°41′31.68″W	A memorial by David Clendining to animals (mainly mules, horse, dogs, pigeons) that have served for Canada in military conflicts since World War I and is located in Confederation Park
Ashburnham Memorial Park		Peterborough, Ontario	44°18′36″N 078°18′10″W	Memorial to the men of Peterborough who died in the First World War.
Bell Island Seaman's Memorial		Lance Cove, Newfoundland	47°36′03.2″N 052°58′40.9″W	Dedicated to commemorate sailors killed by Nazi Germany U-boats in World War II.
Bronze Angel		Montreal, Quebec; Vancouver, British Columbia (pictured); Winnipeg, Manitoba		"Bronze Angel", by sculptor, Coeur Lion MacCarthy, war memorial depicts the angel of victory raising up a young soldier to heaven at the moment of his death, 1921 commemorates 1,115 Canadian Pacific Railway employees killed during the First World War erected at the Canadian Pacific Railway stations.
Camp X Memorial		Whitby Ontario	43°51′20.28″N 078°53′00.06″W	Honours the men and women of Camp X who served during the Second World War.
CANLOAN Memorial		Ottawa, Ontario		Dedicated to Canadian military officers loaned to the British Army under the CANLOAN program during the Second World War.
Coronation Park Memorial		Toronto, Ontario		Dedicated to those who served in the Second World War. Erected in 1995 as a part of the 50th anniversary commemorations of the Second World War.
Cremation Memorial		Ottawa, Ontario	45°26′42″N 075°39′57″W	A sheltered space in the National Cemetery of Canada that honours the memory of Canadian servicemen who died in Canada and the United States and who were cremated.
Cross of Sacrifice		Quebec City, Quebec	46°48′31.9″N 071°12′43.85″W	Dedicated to those who died in the First World War, the Second World War, and the Korean War,
Fredericton Cenotaph		Fredericton, New Brunswick	45°57′30″N 66°38′05″W	Initially dedicated to those who died in the First World War, later expanded to include the Second World War, the Korean War, and the Canadian Merchant Navy.
Great War Memorial		Niagara Falls, Ontario	43°05′23.81″N 079°04′22.57″W	Memorial to those who died in the First and Second World Wars.
Halifax Memorial		Halifax, Nova Scotia	44°37′08.76″N 063°33′55.93″W	Dedicated to the Canadian servicemen and women who died at sea during both World Wars and includes the Royal Canadian Navy, the Canadian Merchant Navy and the Canadian Army.
Harbord War Memorials		Toronto, Ontario		Located on the grounds of Harbord Collegiate Institute, a public secondary school, it includes two sculptures. The first sculpture was erected in 1921 and was dedicated to those who served in the First World War; and a second sculpture dedicated to those who served in the Second World War, completed in 2007.
Law Society of Upper Canada Great War Memorial		Toronto, Ontario		Dedicated to the 115 lawyers and law students of the Law Society of Upper Canada during the First World War. Located in the Great Library of Osgoode Hall.
Mackenzie-Papineau Battalion Memorial		Victoria, British Columbia	48°25′14.20″N 123°22′16.66″W	Dedicated to Canadian volunteers of the Mackenzie–Papineau Battalion during the Spanish Civil War.
Mackenzie-Papineau Battalion Memorial		Ottawa, Ontario	45°26′24.61″N 075°41′47.05″W	Dedicated to Canadian volunteers of the Mackenzie–Papineau Battalion during the Spanish Civil War.
Malvern Memorial		Toronto, Ontario		Dedicated to the students of Malvern Collegiate Institute that served in the First World War. Malvern Collegiate Institute is a public secondary school.
Memorial Clock Tower		Wainwright, Alberta	52°50′00.66″N 110°51′39.76″W	Dedicated to the local men who fought and died in both World Wars.
Memorial Gates		Saskatoon, Saskatchewan	52°07′45.43″N 106°38′34.05″W	Military memorial which is a part of the University of Saskatchewan.
Montreal Cenotaph		Montreal, Quebec	45°29′55.03″N 073°34′07.75″W	Dedicated to Montrealers who died in the First World War.
Montreal Clock Tower		Montreal, Quebec	45°30′44.44″N 073°32′44.84″W	Dedicated to Canadian naval sailors who died during the First World War.
Monument des Braves		Shawinigan, Quebec	46°32′22.38″N 072°45′12.85″W	Commemorates those who died in the First World War, and Second World War
National War Memorial		St. John's, Newfoundland and Labrador	47°34′03.28″N 052°42′13.67″W	Memorial for soldiers who served with the Dominion of Newfoundland during the First World War.
Ottawa Memorial		Ottawa, Ontario	45°26′27.08″N 075°41′45.90″W	Dedicated to missing airmen of the Second World War. Sometimes known as the Commonwealth Air Force Monument.
Peace through Valour		Toronto, Ontario		Dedicated to members of the Canadian Forces who served in the Italian campaign of the Second World War. The sculpture features a 3D-topographical map of Ortona, site of the Battle of Ortona. Located within the sculpture garden of Nathan Phillips Square.
Renfrew War Memorial		Renfrew, Ontario	45°28′22.6848″N 76°41′5.6184″W	Commemorated to residents of Renfrew who served in the First World War and Second World War.
Royal Canadian Naval Association Naval Memorial		Burlington, Ontario		Dedicated to members of the Royal Canadian Navy and the Canadian Merchant Navy.
Saint John War Memorial		Saint John, New Brunswick	45°16′9″N 66°3′25″W	Dedicated to citizens of Saint John who dies in the First World War
Saint-Lambert Cenotaph by Emanuel Hahn		Saint-Lambert, Quebec		Dedicated to citizens of Saint-Lambert who fought in the First World War
Saskatoon Cenotaph		Saskatoon, Saskatchewan	52°07′48.8″N 106°39′37.15″W	Designed by Francis Henry Portnall (1928), this tall granite plinth incorporating a public clock face is a part of the City Hall Square. though it was originally located in the middle of the intersection of 21st Street and 2nd Avenue
Sherbrooke War Memorial		Sherbrooke, Quebec	45°24′02″N 071°53′29″W	Dedicated to citizens of Sherbrooke who fought in the First World War
Soldiers' Tower		Toronto, Ontario	43°39′48.78″N 079°23′42.52″W	Commemorates members of the University of Toronto who served in the World Wars.
Victory Square		Vancouver, British Columbia	49°16′55.56″N 123°06′36.72″W	Dedicated to Vancouverites who served in the First World War.
Vimy Memorial Bandshell		Saskatoon, Saskatchewan	52°07′28.24″N 106°39′33.42″W	The Vimy Memorial Bandshell in Kiwanis Park was built in 1937 to honour the men and women that served in the First World War at the Battle of Vimy Ridge.
War Memorial of Montreal West		Montreal, Quebec	45°28′21.00″N 073°36′49.32″W	Honours those from the town of Montreal West who died in the First World War

=== 1945 – present ===
Memorial name	Image	Location	Map	Notes
Afghanistan Repatriation Memorial		Trenton, Ontario	25°01′37″N 055°22′15″E	Commemorates all the Canadian dead in Afghanistan. Originally located in Camp Mirage, United Arab Emirates.
B.C. Afghanistan War Memorial		Victoria, British Columbia		Commemorates members of the Canadian Armed Forces and the Public Service of Canada who served during the War in Afghanistan. The memorial was dedicated in September 2017.
Canada Company LAV III Monument		Waterloo, Ontario	43°27′51.58″N 080°31′12.29″W	Commemorates members of the Canadian Armed Forces who served during the War in Afghanistan.
Korean War Memorial Wall		Brampton, Ontario	43°38′30.58″N 079°44′57.01″W	Commemorates those Canadians who served in the Korean War.
Monument to the Canadian Fallen (Korean War Monument)		Ottawa, Ontario		Sculpted in 2002 by Young Mun Yoo.
The North Wall		Windsor, Ontario	42°18′37.36″N 083°04′11.06″W	Dedicated to Canadians who volunteered with the United States Armed Forces during the Vietnam War.
Vietnam Veterans Monument		Melocheville, Quebec	45°18′52″N 073°57′40″W	Dedicated to Canadians who volunteered with the United States Armed Forces during the Vietnam War

=== Generic war memorials ===
Memorial name	Image	Location	Map	Notes
48th Highlanders Memorial		Toronto, Ontario	43°39.00′057″N 79°23′34.76″W	Dedicated to those who served with the Canadian forces, erected by the 48th Highlanders of Canada.
Boissevain Cenotaph		Boissevain, Manitoba	49°13'31.9"N 100°03'37.6"W	A monument on the grounds of the Boissevain Hospital commemorates local soldiers killed during military service. It was unveiled originally on 20 July 1924 at a ceremony officiated by General Huntley Douglas Brodie Ketchen.
Bruce Park Cenotaph		Winnipeg, Manitoba	49°52′38.77″N 097°13′34.10″W	Dedicated to the memory of those who died in the First World War, the Second World War, Korea, and to Canadian peacekeepers.
Calgary Soldiers' Memorial		Calgary, Alberta	51°03′03″N 114°05′20″W	Dedicated to Calgarian soldiers who have given their lives in war and military service overseas.
East and West Memorial Buildings		Ottawa, Ontario	45.419517°N 75.70573°W	Dedicated to all Canadians who served in war. The building houses the Department of Veteran Affairs.
Flesherton Cenotaph		Flesherton, Ontario	44°15′46.7″N 080°33′05.5″W	Honouring the local men who enlisted for the First and Second World Wars and did not return.
Garden of the Unforgotten		Oshawa, Ontario	43°53′39.66″N 078°51′46.07″W	Dedicated to the servicemen of Oshawa who lost their lives during the First World War, Second World War and the Korean War
Monument aux braves de N.D.G.		Montreal, Quebec	45°28′20.89″N 073°36′49.44″W	Commemorates the combatants who died during the First and Second World Wars and the Korean War.
National Aboriginal Veterans Monument		Ottawa, Ontario	45°25′18.04″N 075°41′34.66″W	Commemorates the Aboriginal peoples (First Nations, Inuit and Métis) who served with the Canadian forces during armed conflicts.
National Artillery Monument		Ottawa, Ontario		Dedicated to those killed while serving in the Royal Regiment of Canadian Artillery. A 25-pounder gun used by the regiment during the Second World War is situated next to the marble memorial.
Next of Kin Memorial Avenue		Saskatoon, Saskatchewan	52°08′49.36″N 106°39′29.27″W	Memorial for the First World War and ensuing wars.
Old City Hall Cenotaph		Toronto, Ontario	43°39′07.70″N 079°22′54.21″W	Dedicated to Torontonians who lost their lives during the First World War, Second World War and the Korean War.
Ontario Veterans Memorial		Toronto, Ontario	43°39′40.63″N 079°23′28.04″W	Dedicated to the Canadian military who served from the Fenian raids to the Campaign Against Terror.
Memorial Chamber		Ottawa, Ontario	45°25′29.64″N 075°41′59.64″W	Located in the Peace Tower, it holds all eight volumes of the Books of Remembrance, recording every Canadian killed in service, from Canada's first overseas campaign, the Nile Expedition, to the present. The eighth book was added to the Memorial Chamber in 2019, commemorating some 1,600 Canadians and First Nation Crown allies who died in service during the War of 1812.
Peacekeeping Monument		Ottawa, Ontario	45°25′43.58″N 075°41′47.49″W	Commemorates Canadian soldiers who served, or are currently serving in United Nations peacekeeping missions.
Per ardua ad astra		Toronto, Ontario	43°39′16.56″N 079°23′17.6″W	Dedicated to Canadian airmen who fought.
Saskatchewan War Memorial		Regina, Saskatchewan	50°25′58.7568″N 104°37′2.6688″W	Honours those who died in WWI, WWII, Korean War, military training, peacetime operations, nurses who served, including a plaque honouring Saskatchewan War Brides who married Canadian service men.
Scarborough War Memorial		Toronto, Ontario	43°42′08.98″N 079°15′14.03″W	Commemorating the soldiers from Scarborough who died in World War I, World War II and Korean War.
Regina Cenotaph		Regina, Saskatchewan	50°26′52.88″N 104°36′44.18″W	Honour those Regina citizens who served in the First, the Second and the Korean Wars.
The Response – Canadian National War Memorial		Ottawa, Ontario	45°25′26.53″N 075°41′43.79″W	Commemorates the Canadian participation and its soldiers fallen in armed conflict.
Royal Canadian Navy Monument		Ottawa, Ontario	45°25′14.99″N 075°42′37.45″W	Commemorates the men and women who have served or are serving with the Royal Canadian Navy.
Shaunavon War Memorial		Shaunavon, Saskatchewan	49°38′52.12″N 108°24′23.34″W	Designed by Francis Henry Portnall (1926) to honour those citizens who served in the War
Tomb of the Unknown Soldier		Ottawa, Ontario	45°25′26.53″N 075°41′43.79″W	Dedicated to all the unidentified Canadian soldiers and is part of the National War Memorial.
Trenton Cenotaph		Trenton, Ontario	44°06′01.44″N 077°34′31.44″W	Dedicated to all Canadians fallen in conflict
Valiants Memorial		Ottawa, Ontario	45°25′27.92″N 075°41′42.67″W	Commemorating fourteen signal figures from the military history of the country, from French colonial rule, to the Second World War.
London Cenotaph		London, Ontario	42°59′15.66″N 081°14′48.54″W	Commemorates the local soldiers who died during the First, the Second and the Korean Wars.
Thunder Bay Cenotaph		Thunder Bay, Ontario	48°26′15.9″N 089°13′34.88″W	Commemorates the local soldiers who died during the First, the Second and the Korean Wars.
Welland-Crowland War Memorial		Welland, Ontario	42°59′51″N 079°15′31″W	Designed by Elizabeth Wyn Wood, commemorates not only the war dead but also those who served at home.

== War memorials overseas ==
Memorial name	Image	Location	Map	Notes
Canada Memorial		Green Park, London, England	51°30′10.36″N 000°08′33.48″W	Pays tribute to the nearly one million Canadian men and women who served in the United Kingdom during the First and Second World Wars.

=== First World War ===
Memorial name	Image	Location	Map	Notes
Beaumont-Hamel Newfoundland Memorial		Beaumont-Hamel, Somme, France	50°04′24.80″N 002°38′53.09″E	Commemorating the Royal Newfoundland Regiment's participation in the Battle of the Somme.
Bourlon Wood Memorial		Bourlon, France	50°10′24.51″N 003°07′09.14″E	Commemorating the Canadian participation from the Battle of Canal du Nord until the Armistice of 11 November 1918.
Canadian National Vimy Memorial		Givenchy-en-Gohelle, France	50°22′46.55″N 002°46′26.36″E	Canadian Expeditionary Force members killed during the First World War and Canadian soldiers killed or presumed dead in France who have no known grave. The memorial was designed by Walter Seymour Allward, and is located on the site of the Easter 1917 Battle of Vimy Ridge.
Courcelette Memorial		Courcelette, France	50°03′15.12″N 002°45′05.19″E	Commemorating the Canadian participation in the Battle of the Somme.
Courtrai Newfoundland Memorial		Courtrai, Belgium	50°50′19.47″N 003°17′06.69″E	Commemorating the actions of the Royal Newfoundland Regiment during the Battle of Courtrai.
Dury Memorial		Dury, France	50°14′02.90″N 002°59′50.12″E	Commemorating the breaking of the Drocourt-Quéant Line.
The Fighting Newfoundlander		St. John's, Newfoundland and Labrador	47°31′36.5″N 52°44′54.5″W	Commemorating the Royal Newfoundland Regiment
Gallipoli Newfoundland Memorial		Suvla Bay, Gallipoli, Turkey	40°18′45.5″N 26°15′07.6″E	Commemorating the Royal Newfoundland Regiment's participation in the Gallipoli campaign.
Gueudecourt Memorial		Gueudecourt, France	50°03′54.31″N 002°51′13.24″E	Dedicated to the Newfoundlanders who fought during the Battle of Le Transloy.
Hill 62 (Sanctuary Wood) Memorial		Zonnebeke, Belgium	50°50′03.79″N 002°56′50.08″E	Commemorating the defence of the Ypres Salient.
Le Quesnel Memorial		Le Quesnel, France	49°46′29.96″N 002°36′33.85″E	Commemorating the Canadian participation in the Battle of Amiens.
Masnières Newfoundland Memorial		Masnières, France	50°07′24.4″N 003°12′42.2″E	Commemorates the actions of the Royal Newfoundland Regiment during the First Battle of Cambrai, of World War I.
Menin Gate		Ypres, Belgium	50°51′07.41″N 002°53′28.55″E	Commemorating the defenders that died in the Ypres Salient and whose graves are unknown.
Monchy-le-Preux Memorial		Monchy-le-Preux, France	50°16′14.17″N 002°53′35.95″E	Commemorates the Royal Newfoundland Regiment's participation during the Battle of Arras.
Passchendaele Memorial		Passendale, Belgium	50°53′51.89″N 003°00′47.63″E	the Canadian participation in the Second Battle of Passchendaele.
Saint Julien Memorial		Ypres, Belgium	50°53′58.65″N 002°56′26.41″E	Commemorating the Canadian participation in the Second Battle of Ypres.
Portuguese Fireplace		Lyndhurst, Hampshire, England	50°52′08.36″N 001°37′26.81″W	Also known as the Canadian Fireplace it commemorates the Canadian Forestry Corps and lumbermen who worked with the Portuguese
29th Division Column		Stretton on Dunsmore, England	52°21′21.3″N 001°23′32.0″W	A large commemorative Portland stone obelisk, built in 1921 to remember the Division's review by King George V and commemorates the Royal Newfoundland Regiment's participation during the Battle of Gallipoli.

=== Second World War – present ===
Memorial name	Image	Location	Map	Notes
Gapyeong Canada Monument		Gapyeong County, Gyeonggi Province, South Korea	37°52′36.71″N 127°31′48.79″E	Dedicated to the sacrifices made by the Canadian forces during the Korean war, especially at the Battle of Kapyong.
Kandahar Airfield Memorial and Memorial Inuksuk		Kandahar, Afghanistan	31°30′21″N 065°50′52″E	The Airfield Memorial is dedicated to Canadians who have fallen in the War in Afghanistan and the Inuksuk to those Canadians, as well as other coalition members who were killed in fighting in Afghanistan.
Malta Memorial		Floriana, Malta	35°53′40.57″N 014°30′28.27″E	Dedicated to Commonwealth aircrew (including Canadians) who fought, and lost their lives, in the Mediterranean during the Second World War.
Monument to Canadian Fallen (Korean War Monument)		United Nations Memorial Cemetery; Busan, South Korea	35°07′41″N 129°05′49″E	Located where 378 Canadians are buried. An identical monument is in downtown Ottawa.
National Canadian Liberation Monument		Apeldoorn, Netherlands		Celebrating the liberation of the Netherlands by Canadians, featuring the sculpture Man with Two Hats, identical to one in Ottawa.

== Legacy ==
The 31 paintings of Canadian War Memorials by F.A. (Tex) Dawson were unveiled just outside Currie Hall in the Mackenzie Building at Royal Military College of Canada in Kingston on Wednesday 7 April 2010. Jack Pike, the chairman of the Royal Military College of Canada Museum's board of directors, said they had found a permanent and appropriate home. "We are delighted to have these paintings," he said in front of the assemblage of paintings, each representing a different memorial in a different setting and different seasons. "These are symbolic of sacrifice and remembrance and they do the whole thing so well."

== See also ==
- Canadian War Museum
- List of Canadian Victoria Cross recipients
- List of Royal Military College of Canada Memorials and traditions
