= Thomas Nangle =

Newfoundland priest and diplomat (1889–1972)

Reverend Thomas Nangle
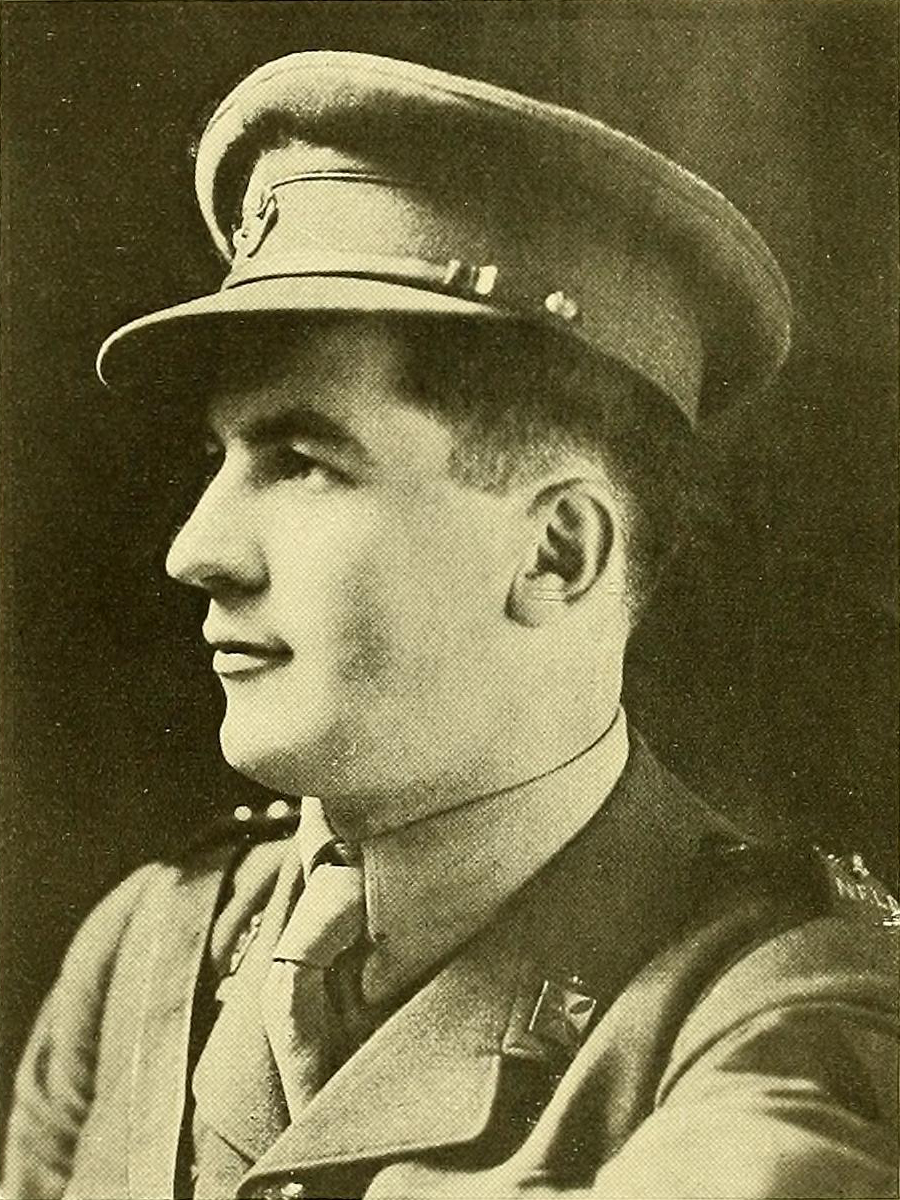
- Nangle in 1921
- Born: September 5, 1889; St. John's, Newfoundland Colony
- Died: January 4, 1972 (aged 82); Rhodesia
- Education: All Hallows College; St. Patrick's, Carlow College
- Religion: Roman Catholic
- Military service
- Branch: Royal Newfoundland Regiment
- Service years: 1915–1926
- Rank: Lieutenant colonel

Member of the Southern Rhodesian Legislative Assembly for Salisbury District
- In office 3 September 1933 – 7 November 1934
- Preceded by: William Muter Leggate
- Succeeded by: Godfrey Huggins

Thomas Matthew Mary Nangle (September 5, 1889 – January 4, 1972) (known to family and friends as "Tim") was a Newfoundland cleric and diplomat. He served as the military chaplain of the Royal Newfoundland Regiment during World War I. In his later life, he moved to Southern Rhodesia, where he became a farmer and was briefly elected to their Legislative Assembly.

== Early life ==
Nangle was born in St. John's, Newfoundland, the son of a tailor. He was educated at St. Bonaventure College before attending All Hallows College seminary in Dublin and St. Patrick's, Carlow College in Ireland.

Nangle was ordained in the Roman Catholic priesthood in 1913 at the Basilica of St. John the Baptist in St. John's. When the Great War broke out, he enlisted in the Newfoundland Regiment in 1915. He became the regiment's padre and eventually gained the rank of lieutenant-colonel. While on furlough in 1917, he returned to St. John's, Newfoundland to deliver popular lectures about the experiences of the troops and calling for new recruits to join the war effort.

== Public service career ==
Following the war, Nangle was appointed by the Dominion of Newfoundland's government as the Director of War Graves, Registration, Enquiries and Memorials. He was also made the country's representative on the Imperial War Graves Commission in London, where he supervised the construction of memorials to Newfoundland soldiers. These included the National War Memorial at King's Beach in St. John's. He was also responsible for the "Trail of the Caribou" memorials in each of the noteworthy battlefields where the Royal Newfoundland Regiment fought: Beaumont Hamel, Gueudecourt, Masnières, and Monchy-le-Preux in France, Courtrai/Kortrijk in Belgium, and Gallipoli in Turkey.

== Rhodesia ==
In 1926, Nangle abruptly left the priesthood and emigrated to Southern Rhodesia (today Zimbabwe) in Africa. In a 1960 letter to Premier Joey Smallwood, Nangle revealed that his wartime service caused him to have a crisis of faith, and he privately became an agnostic. As he was "faced with the choice of being a living hypocrite all the rest of my life or clearing out to avoid as much scandal as possible," he chose to leave his life in Newfoundland behind and start anew.

In Rhodesia, Nangle became a farmer and married a local woman. He became politically active and helped establish the Reform Party, which formed the government in the 1933 election under Godfrey Huggins. Nangle was elected that year to the Southern Rhodesian Legislative Assembly as the Reform Member of Parliament (MP) for Salisbury District. When the party split on ideological lines, Nangle was challenged by Huggins in his district, and he was defeated in the subsequent 1934 election. He twice attempted to return to the legislative assembly as a candidate for the Rhodesia Labour Party in 1946 and 1948, but he was defeated in both elections. He died in Rhodesia in 1972 at the age of 83 and was buried in the city of Kwekwe.

== Legacy ==
A street in St. John's is named Padre Nangle Place in his honour, and in 2016, Nangle was named a National Historic Person.

Southern Rhodesian Legislative Assembly
Preceded by William Muter Leggate	Member of Parliament for Salisbury District; 1933 – 1934	Succeeded by Godfrey Huggins
