= War of 1812 Monument =

Triumph Through Diversity
- Triomphe grâce à la diversité (French)
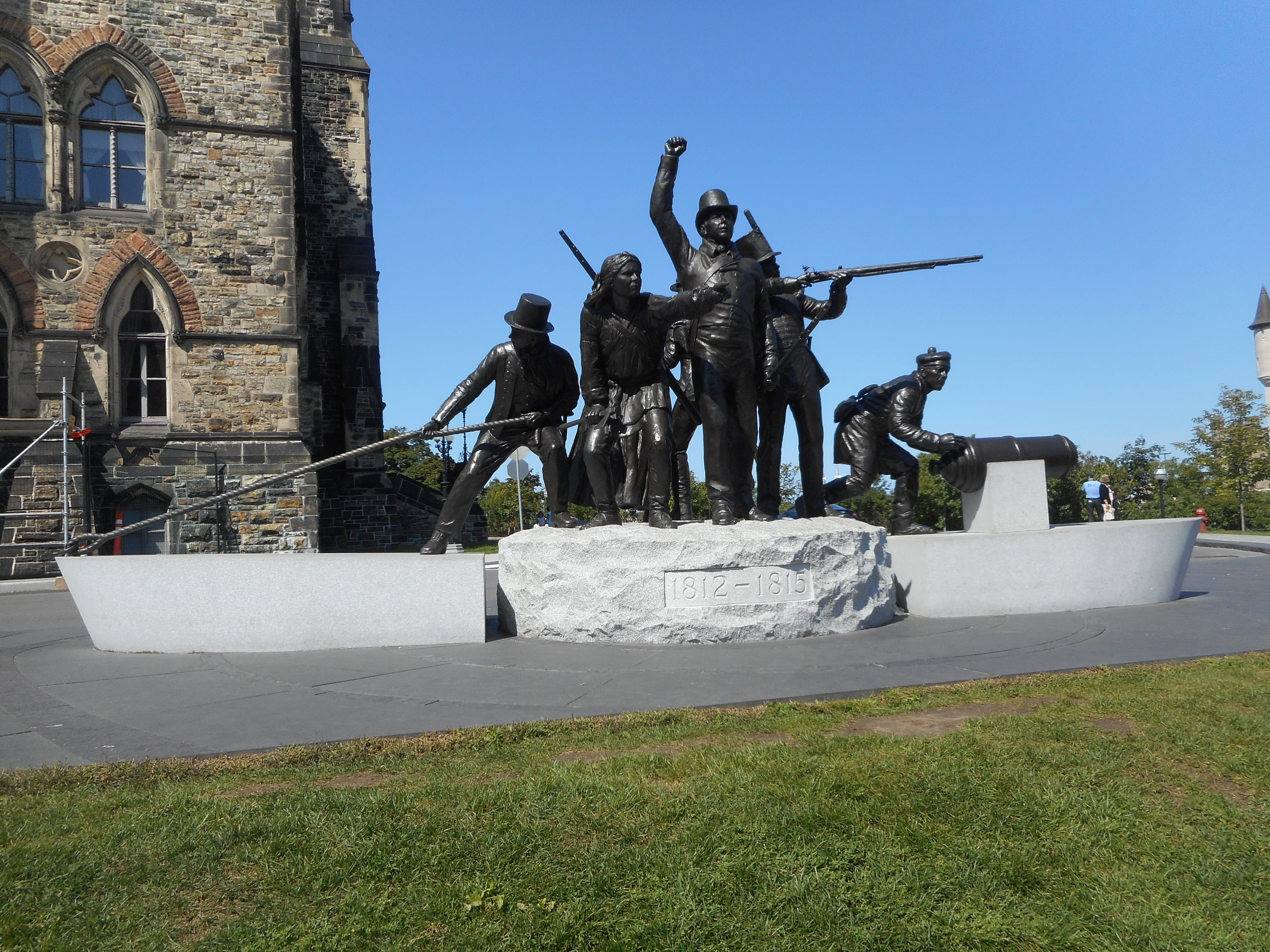
- Interactive map of Triumph Through Diversity
- Location: Parliament Hill, Ottawa, Ontario, Canada
- Designer: Adrienne Alison
- Type: War memorial
- Material: Bronze (statues), granite (plinths)
- Dedicated date: 6 November 2014
- Website: www.canada.ca/en/canadian-heritage/services/art-monuments/monuments/war-1812.html

The War of 1812 Monument, officially titled Triumph Through Diversity (Triomphe grâce à la diversité in French), is a bronze and stone memorial, located at Parliament Hill in Ottawa, Ontario, Canada, Canada's capital. Seven figures—a First Nations fighter, a Métis militiaman, a regular infantryman from the Royal Newfoundland Regiment of Fencible Infantry, a Quebec soldier of the Canadian Voltigeurs being bandaged by a female figure, a Royal Navy marine, and a farmer—represent those who took part on the Canadian side of the War of 1812. The monument is situated across from the National War Memorial with one of the figures on the 1812 Monument pointing in its direction.

Also part of the monument is a maple tree planted in soil taken from 10 Canadian battlefield sites and watered at the dedication with water from six oceans and lakes significant in the War of 1812. The tree symbolizes the Canadian nation that grew out of the effort to defend Canada during the War of 1812.

The monument was dedicated on 6 November 2014, the 200th anniversary of the war's final battle in Canada, the Battle of Malcolm's Mills.

== See also ==
- Canadian war memorials
