= The Fighting Newfoundlander =

Statue in St. John's, Newfoundland and Labrador, Canada

- The statue in 2005
- Interactive map of The Fighting Newfoundlander
- Location: Bowring Park, St. John's, Newfoundland and Labrador, Canada
- Coordinates: 47°31′36.5″N 52°44′54.5″W
- Designer: Basil Gotto
- Type: Statue
- Height: 15 feet (4.6 m)
- Beginning date: 1918
- Completion date: 1919
- Dedicated date: September 13, 1922
- Dedicated to: Royal Newfoundland Regiment

The Fighting Newfoundlander is a statue in Bowring Park in St. John's, Newfoundland and Labrador, Canada. It was designed by sculptor Basil Gotto and depicts a soldier of the Royal Newfoundland Regiment during World War I. The monument was dedicated on September 13, 1922, as a gift from businessman Edgar Rennie Bowring to the city in honor of the regiment.

== Design ==
The monument consists of a statue of a soldier during battle, holding a rifle in one hand and a grenade in the other. Affixed to the firearm is a bayonet. The soldier is wearing a gas mask which dangles around his neck. The monument features inscriptions on its front and back, which read as follows:

THE FIGHTING / NEWFOUNDLANDER / PRESENTED TO THE CITY / OF ST. JOHN'S BY THE HON. / SIR EDGAR R. BOWRING

— Front

A TRIBUTE TO THE UNDYING / MEMORY OF THE ROYAL / NEWFOUNDLAND REGIMENT / 1914–1918

— Back

The monument stands 15 feet (4.6 metres) tall.

== History ==
=== Creation ===
The monument was made by sculptor Basil Gotto, who had been commissioned to create a statue of a soldier during World War I. Gotto created the work in England, modeling the statue after Corporal Thomas Pittman of the Newfoundland town of Little Bay East, who was stationed at Hazley Down Camp during the war. For about two months in 1918, Pittman posed for Gotto while wearing his military uniform, doing so for about one hour per day until the work was completed. Pittman, who was wounded at the Battle of the Somme, was awarded the Distinguished Conduct Medal and the Military Medal for his service during the conflict. Following the war, he returned home to Newfoundland, eventually dying in 1966 and being buried in the Mount Pleasant Cemetery of St. John's, Newfoundland. During the sculptures creation, some of Pittman's comrades would visit the studio and call him "the Fighting Newfoundlander", which is where the statue's name comes from. Gotto completed the work in early 1919.

=== Dedication and later history ===
Following its creation, the monument was given to the city of St. John's, having been donated by businessman Edgar Rennie Bowring. An additional copy of the statue was kept by the Bowring family. It was erected in the city's Bowring Park, near a bungalow that overlooks Waterford Valley, in honor of the Royal Newfoundland Regiment.

A photograph of the train that carried visitors to the park for the statue's dedication.

The dedication ceremony occurred on September 13, 1922. The event was a significant occasion for the city, with Bowring arranging for a train to transport visitors to the park. William Horwood served as the event's master of ceremonies, with other local businessmen and politicians, including Joseph Outerbridge, serving as guests of honour. Horwood gave a speech after the statue, which was covered with a Union Jack, was unveiled, and this was followed by a presentation of the statue by Bowring. Afterwards, Tasker Cook, the mayor of St. John's, accepted the monument on behalf of the city. The last speech was given by A. B. Baird, the president of the local Great War Veteran's Association, which was followed by performances of "Fight the Good Fight" and "Ode to Newfoundland" to conclude the event. Following the dedication ceremony, there was a dance at the bungalow.

On July 9, 1923, the government of Newfoundland issued a stamp featuring the monument. Several years later, on July 1, 1928, a statue of a caribou by the same sculptor was installed in the park. In 2007, the statue was restored by Luben Boykov, a Newfoundland sculptor.

== See also ==
- 1922 in art
- Art of Newfoundland and Labrador
- Canadian war memorials
- List of World War I monuments and memorials
