= Masnières Newfoundland Memorial =

War memorial in France

Coordinates: 50°7′24.4″N 3°12′42.2″E

- Canada (formerly Dominion of Newfoundland)
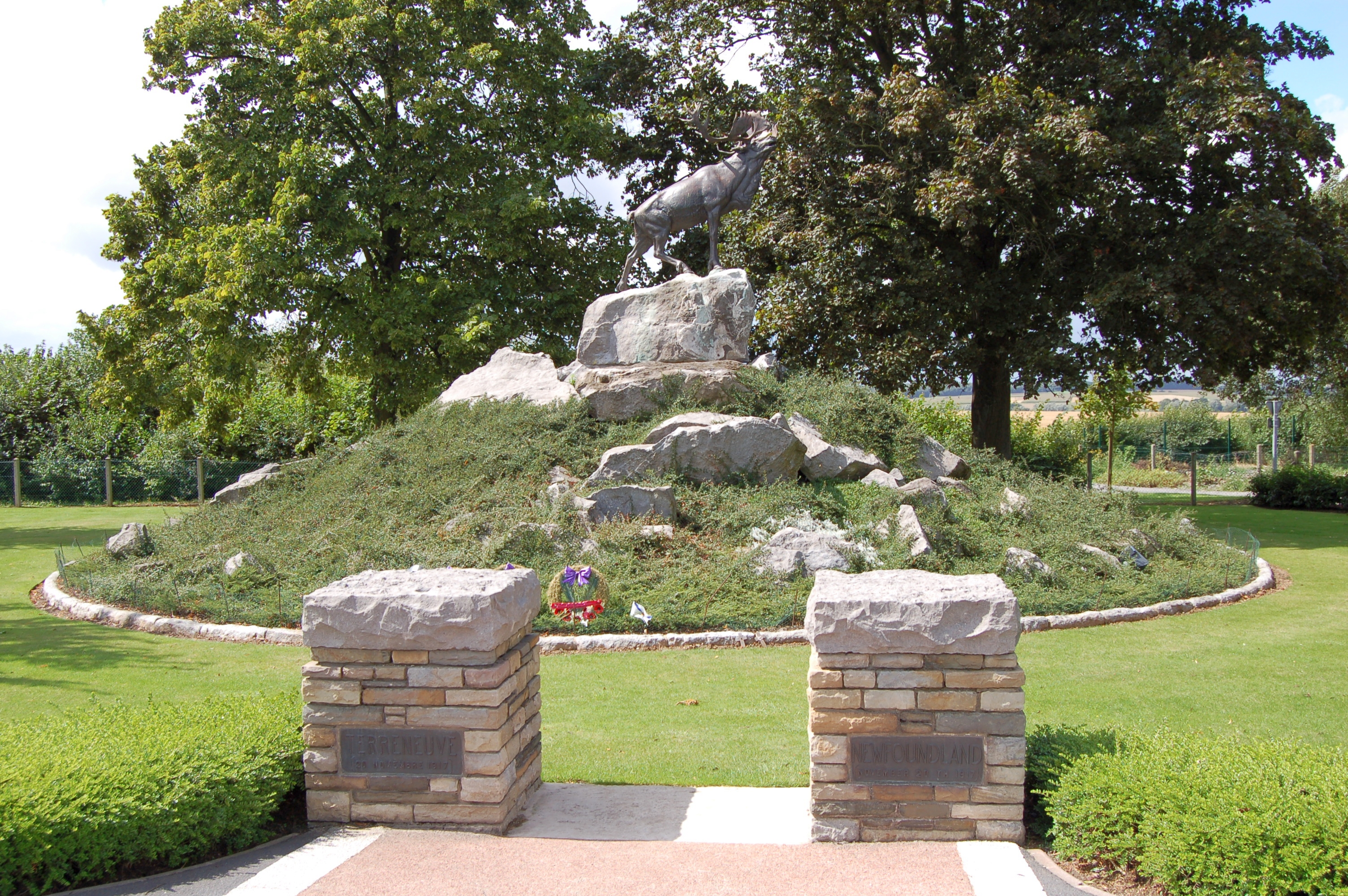
- The Newfoundland Masnières Memorial
- For the actions of the Royal Newfoundland Regiment during the First World War Battle of Cambrai.
- Location: near Masnières, France
- Masnières 1917

The Masnières Newfoundland Memorial is a Dominion of Newfoundland war memorial that commemorates the actions of the Royal Newfoundland Regiment during the First Battle of Cambrai, of World War I. Located at the north end of the town of Masnières, France, the memorial commemorates the participation of the Newfoundlanders in the taking and defense of the town during the First Battle of Cambrai between 20 November and 2 December 1917.

== The battle ==
In November 1917 the Royal Newfoundland Regiment was one of four battalions of the 88th Brigade, British 29th Division, Third Army which would participate in the First Battle of Cambrai under the overall command of General Julian Byng.

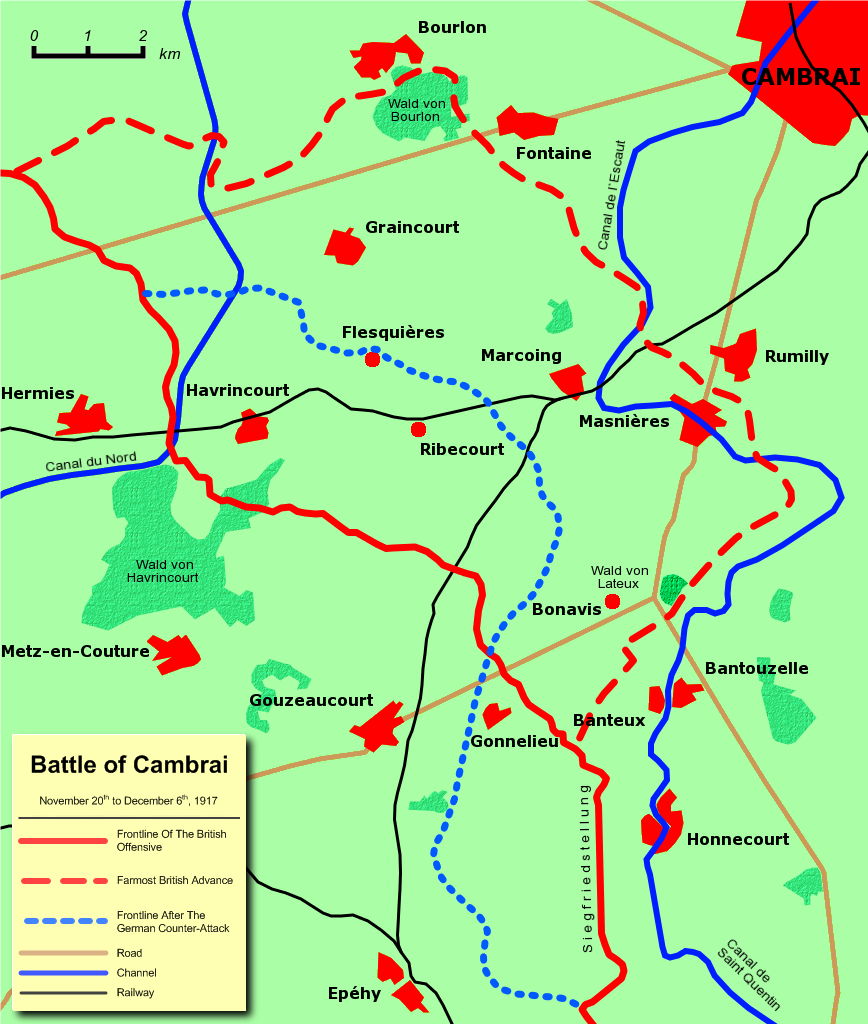
Battle lines showing the progressions of the Battle of Cambrai. Masnières is in the upper centre of the right side of the map.

On the opening day of the battle, 20 November, the Royal Newfoundland Regiment (along with the rest of the 29th Division) were initially held in reserve as reinforcements. Without a preparatory artillery barrage and led by tanks, the initial surprise attack struck the heavily fortified Hindenburg Line and Hindenburg Support Line and saw positive results, opening significant holes in the German defensive lines. The 29th division was then sent in to 'mop up' pockets of German resistance.

When sent in, the 29th Division's objective was to consolidate bridgeheads over the St. Quentin Canal with the Newfoundland Regiment and the 88th Brigade's thrust to solidify the capture of a strategic section of the St. Quentin Canal and the town of Masnières. The town was a strategic strong-point that protected several crossings over the canal that needed to be captured to give the British cavalry a crossing en route to their objective, the city of Cambrai in a subsequent phase of the battle. By the end of day on the 20th, the Newfoundlanders had fought their way into the outskirts of Masnières and the following day cleared the last defenders and consolidated hold on the town.

However, the British advance had created a precarious bulge of the lines into German-held territory about 6.5 kilometres (4 miles) deep and 15 kilometres (9.3 miles) wide which was surrounded on three sides by the enemy. Ten days after the initial attack, on 30 November, the Germans appeared to have identified this vulnerability and launched an attack against the right flank of the salient to the south of Masnières, squarely onto the Newfoundlanders and 88th Brigade. The enemy's thrust into the British lines threatened cut off the salient and to encircle the Third Army troops within, but the four Battalions of the 88th Brigade counter-attacked and pushed the enemy back 1500 metres. The fight was costly, as the commanding officer of the Newfoundland Battalion recorded: "Our strength in the morning, 9 officers, 360 other ranks; at night, 8 officers, 230 other ranks." in his diary that night.

Having withstood the shock of the initial attack, the Newfoundlanders continued to hold their positions for another day while commanders came to understand the vulnerability of the salient was untenable and on 4 December a fighting withdrawal to the original German second line of defense, the Hindenburg Support System was organized by Byng.

Combined with their earlier service in the war at Beaumont-Hamel, Gueudecourt, in the Third Battle of Ypres and once again at Masnières, the grit and resilience shown by the 'Blue Puttees' had led to the Regiment coming to be very well regarded as a fighting force. In fact, a little more than a month after Cambrai, on 25 January 1918, His Majesty King George V conferred the title of "Royal" onto the regiment in recognition for its service. This proved to be a distinction that was awarded to no other regiment of the British Army while fighting was still in progress during the First World War.

== Memorial ==
The memorial is one of six erected in Europe by the Newfoundland government following the First World War. Four were erected in France at Beaumont-Hamel, Gueudecourt, Masnières and Monchy-le-Preux, one stands at Courtrai/Kortrijk in Belgium and a sixth was built in Turkey at Gallipoli. A seventh memorial is situated in Bowring Park in St. John's, Newfoundland, Canada and was a gift from Major William Howe Greene, OBE, who served with the Newfoundlanders during the war.
All of the memorials are centrally identical, featuring the emblem of the Royal Newfoundland Regiment, a caribou, cast in bronze, as designed by British sculptor Basil Gotto. Standing atop a cairn of Newfoundland granite, the caribou faces and appears to roar in the direction the Newfoundlanders faced toward the enemy during the battle.

The Masnières Memorial is situated on the west side of the D644 road, at the north end of the village of Masnières. The Caribou is surrounded by a small park, roughly in the shape of a parallelogram. The Monument itself is situated in the centre of the park; at the cairn's base is a circular garden and, surrounding that, is a level lawn of grass with several maple trees at points around the three sides away from the road.
