= Gueudecourt =

- Commune
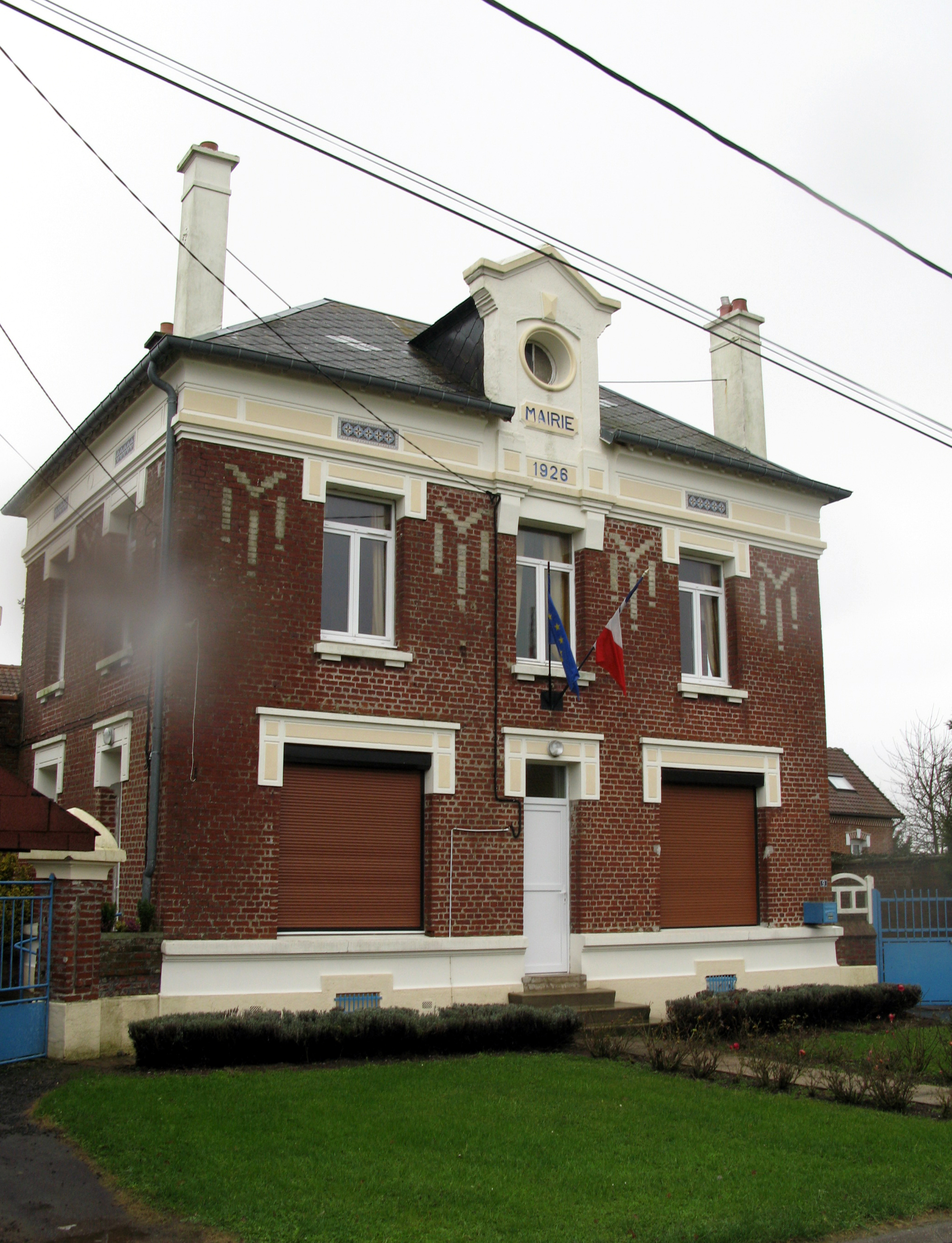
- Town hall
- Location of Gueudecourt
- Location within France Location within Hauts-de-France
- Coordinates: 50°03′34″N 2°50′36″E
- Country: France
- Region: Hauts-de-France
- Department: Somme
- Arrondissement: Péronne
- Canton: Péronne
- Intercommunality: Haute Somme

Government
  - Mayor (2020–2026): Damien Guise
- Area^{1}: 4.87 km^{2} (1.88 sq mi)
- Elevation: 119 m (390 ft)
- Highest elevation: 147 m (482 ft)
- Lowest elevation: 104 m (341 ft)
- Population (2023): 101
  - Density: 20.7/km^{2} (53.7/sq mi)
- Time zone: UTC+01:00 (CET)
  - Summer (DST): UTC+02:00 (CEST)
- INSEE/Postal code: 80397 /80360
- ^{1} French Land Register data, which excludes lakes, ponds, glaciers > 1 km^{2} (0.386 sq mi or 247 acres) and river estuaries.

Gueudecourt (French pronunciation: [ɡødkuʁ]) is a commune in the Somme department in Hauts-de-France in northern France.

== History ==
During the Battle of the Somme, the town of Gueudecourt had represented one of the most distant objectives for the British drive that opened on 15 September 1916, a drive that has come to be known as the Battle of Flers-Courcelette.

Although the British had not been able to take Gueudecourt during the battle’s commencement, continual fighting had brought the town within reach by 25 September, when the Battle of Morval opened. The primary trench-lines that guarded the town, and through which the 21st Division of the XV Corps had to assault, were Goat Trench, Gird Trench, and Gird Support. The 10th King's Own Yorkshire Light Infantry and the 1st East Yorks (64th Brigade) attacked Gird Trench, but could make no headway, while the 1st Lincolns were stopped by shellfire in the British frontline. The 8th and 9th Leicesters (110th Brigade) had greater success, taking Goat Trench, but machine-gun fire prevented them from taking Gird.

On the morning of 26 September, at 6:30 am, a tank came up Pilgrim’s way to assist in the capture of Gird trench—the Battle of Morval marked only the second use of tanks in war. Behind the tank, bombers of the 7th Leicesters followed, driving the Germans from Gird Trench. The tank moved towards the Southeast of Gueudecourt before retiring from the scene. A combined thrust of infantry (6th Leicesters) and cavalry (19th Lancers and South Irish Horse) occupied the town that evening. The final position in this sector, as of 26 September, was a little short of the Gueudecourt—Le Transloy road.

For the next phase of the Somme Offensive, the Battle of Le Transloy, men of the 88th Brigade including the Royal Newfoundland Regiment and 1st Essex Battalion were brought into the lines that ran through and around the northern edge of the village on 10 October 1916. From there, on 12 October the two battalions attacked the German front line 'Hilt Trench' behind a "creeping barrage" and engaged in hand-to-hand fighting, successfully taking the position. Moving on from Hilt, their final objective, 'Grease Trench' lay 750 metres from their jumping off point. However, a withering machine gun fire denied the 88th Brigade attackers this position and forced them back into Hilt Trench and a German counter-attack drove the 1st Essex off of the left flank and back into the original Allied position. The Newfoundlanders, however, hung on to their positions and fought to secure their flank. Using Mills Bombs they repelled the German counter-attackers from the 1st Essex' stretch of Hilt and re-took the trench, effectively doubling the length of their defensive line. Anticipating further German counter-attacks the Newfoundlanders frantically dug a fire step and piled a parapet on the reverse side of the German trench. When the expected counter-attacks through the afternoon and night came the Newfoundlander's rifle and Lewis Gun fire turned back all attacks and the Hilt Trench was held.

Today the Newfoundlanders actions at Gueudecourt are commemorated with the Gueudecourt Newfoundland Memorial which sits beside the D574 road, about one kilometre northeast of the village. The location of the Memorial marks the furthest point of advance of British units during the Battle of the Somme.

== See also ==
- Communes of the Somme department
