= Courtrai Newfoundland Memorial =

Memorial in Kortrijk, Belgium

Courtrai Memorial
- Canada (formerly Dominion of Newfoundland)
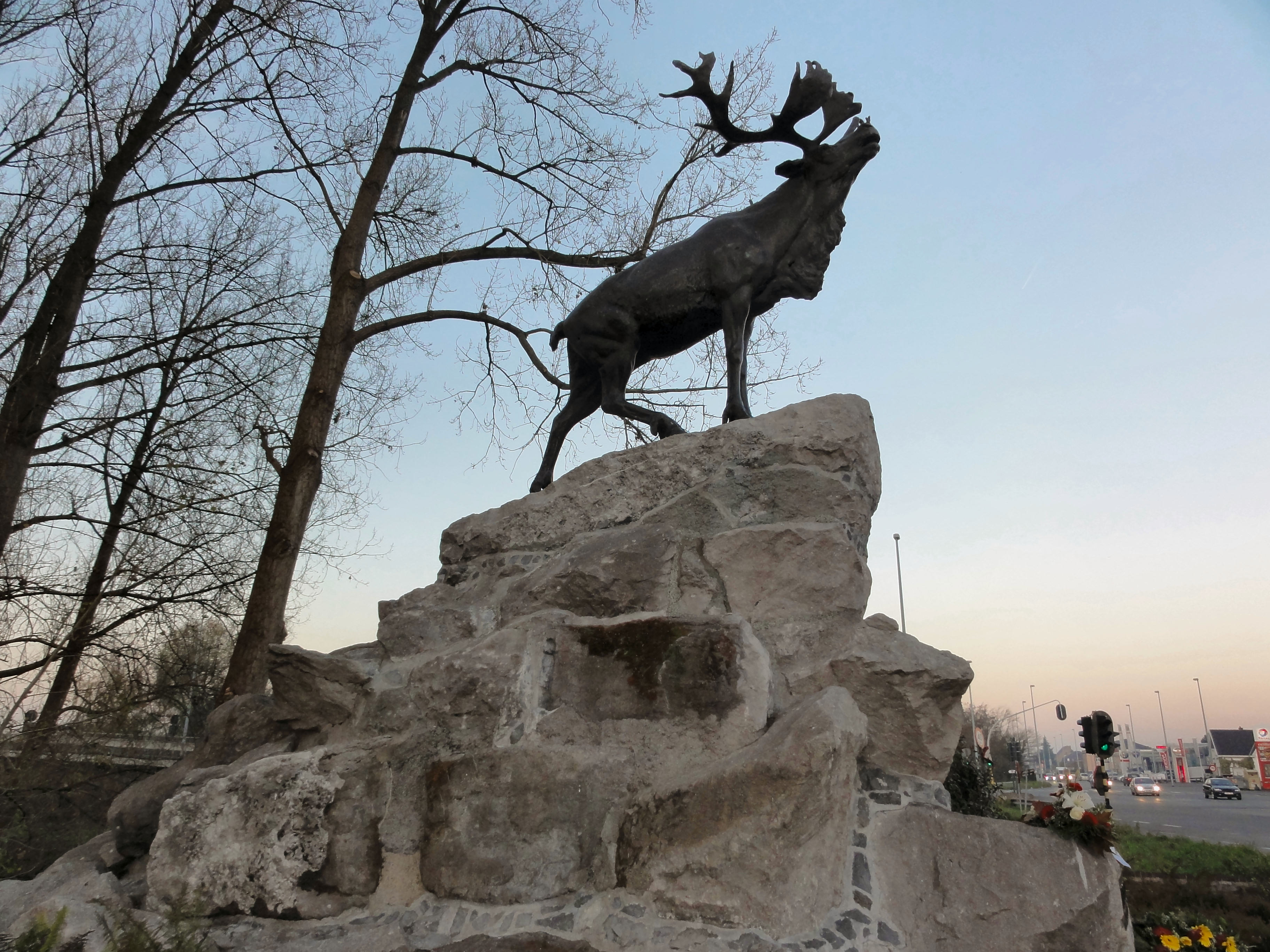
- The Courtrai Newfoundland Memorial
- For the actions of the Royal Newfoundland Regiment during the First World War Battle of Courtrai.
- Location: 50°50′19.47″N 003°17′06.69″E near Courtrai, Belgium
- Courtrai 1918

The Courtrai Memorial is a Dominion of Newfoundland war memorial in Kortrijk (formerly referred to as Courtrai), Belgium, that commemorates the actions of the Royal Newfoundland Regiment during the First World War when it served and fought in several campaigns in Belgium from 1916 to 1918.

== Historic context ==
The Caribou of the Royal Newfoundland Regiment at Courtrai commemorates the Battalion's actions of the Hundred Days Campaign and specifically, the crossing of the Lys River in the closing months of the Great War.

During the final year of the war in 1918, the Royal Newfoundland Regiment was posted in the northern sector of the front around Ypres. There, they weathered the onslaught of the final German spring offensive in defensive actions during the Battle of the Lys. During this time they earned the right to add the name "Bailleul" to the Regiment's battle honours.

A re-organization in mid-September saw the Battalion attached to the 28th Infantry Brigade, 9th (Scottish) Division, of the British Second Army, with whom it would remain for the final two months of the war. That month, the Second Army struck eastward from its positions around Ypres, where the Newfoundlanders were involved in recapturing positions on Passchendaele Ridge which the Germans had taken in the previous spring's Kaiserschlacht. By the conclusion of two days fighting, the Newfoundland Battalion had played an important part in breaking through German's "Flanders Position" and advanced fourteen and a half kilometres.

After consolidating the advance, the offensive resumed on the 14th of October in what came to be known as the Battle of Courtrai. The Second Army continued its push eastward toward Ghent, with the Newfoundlanders directed to help establish a bridgehead across the Lys/Leie river at the north end of the city of Courtrai. Commencing at 05:35 on the morning of October 14, the Battalion faced withering shelling from German field guns and infantry fighting from hardened pillboxes. At a moment during which this advance had stalled, 17-year-old Thomas Ricketts brave and bold actions helped restore the progress of the attack and proved vital to his platoon to capturing eight prisoners, four machine-guns and four field guns and led to Ricketts becoming the youngest ever British Army combatant to earn the Victoria Cross. That day the Newfoundlanders took eight field guns, 94 machine-guns, 500 prisoners and significant stockpiles of enemy ammunition, but also took heavy losses themselves, as only 300 riflemen were fit for action the following day.

At the river, the enemy held the onslaught back for several days, but on the night of the 19th-20 October, a final major assault secured the bridgehead. The Newfoundlanders, who had crossed the river by raft in darkness, saw the sun rise the far bank on October 20. This defeat added to the overwhelming weight straining the morale of the German Army in Belgium, whose surrender would come less than a month later.

== The Memorial ==
The Newfoundland Courtrai Memorial is one of six erected in Europe by the Newfoundland government to commemorate the Royal Newfoundland Regiment's actions during the First World War. The Courtrai caribou stands as the sole monument to the Newfoundlanders actions in Belgium, with four more in France at Beaumont-Hamel, Gueudecourt, Masnières, and Monchy-le-Preux and one at Gallipoli in Turkey. A seventh caribou, a gift from Major William Howe Greene, OBE, who served with the Newfoundlanders during the war stands in Bowring Park in St. John's, Newfoundland, Canada.
The memorials are all centrally identical, featuring a bronze statue of the emblem of the Royal Newfoundland Regiment, a caribou, designed by British sculptor Basil Gotto. Standing atop a cairn of Newfoundland granite, the caribou faces the direction the Newfoundlanders faced toward the enemy during the battle.

A spot the banks of the Lys/Leie River in the northeast of Kortrijk, where the Newfoundlanders landed in the early morning hours of August 20, 1918 was chosen for the memorial at Kortrijk. There, in the centre of a small park embedded with plants native to Newfoundland and Labrador the memorial caribou stands on its Newfoundland granite cairn bearing bronze plaque that reads: "COURTRAI, 1918". The park and memorial can be found situated on the northwest side of the road to Ghent - the N43 Road/Gentsesteenweg, about 25 metres from its intersection with the Kortrijk 'Ringlaan' periphery road, the R8/N395b.
