= National War Memorial (Newfoundland) =

World War I memorial in St. John's, Newfoundland and Labrador

- Dominion of Newfoundland; Newfoundland and Labrador; Veterans Affairs Canada; Commonwealth War Graves Commission
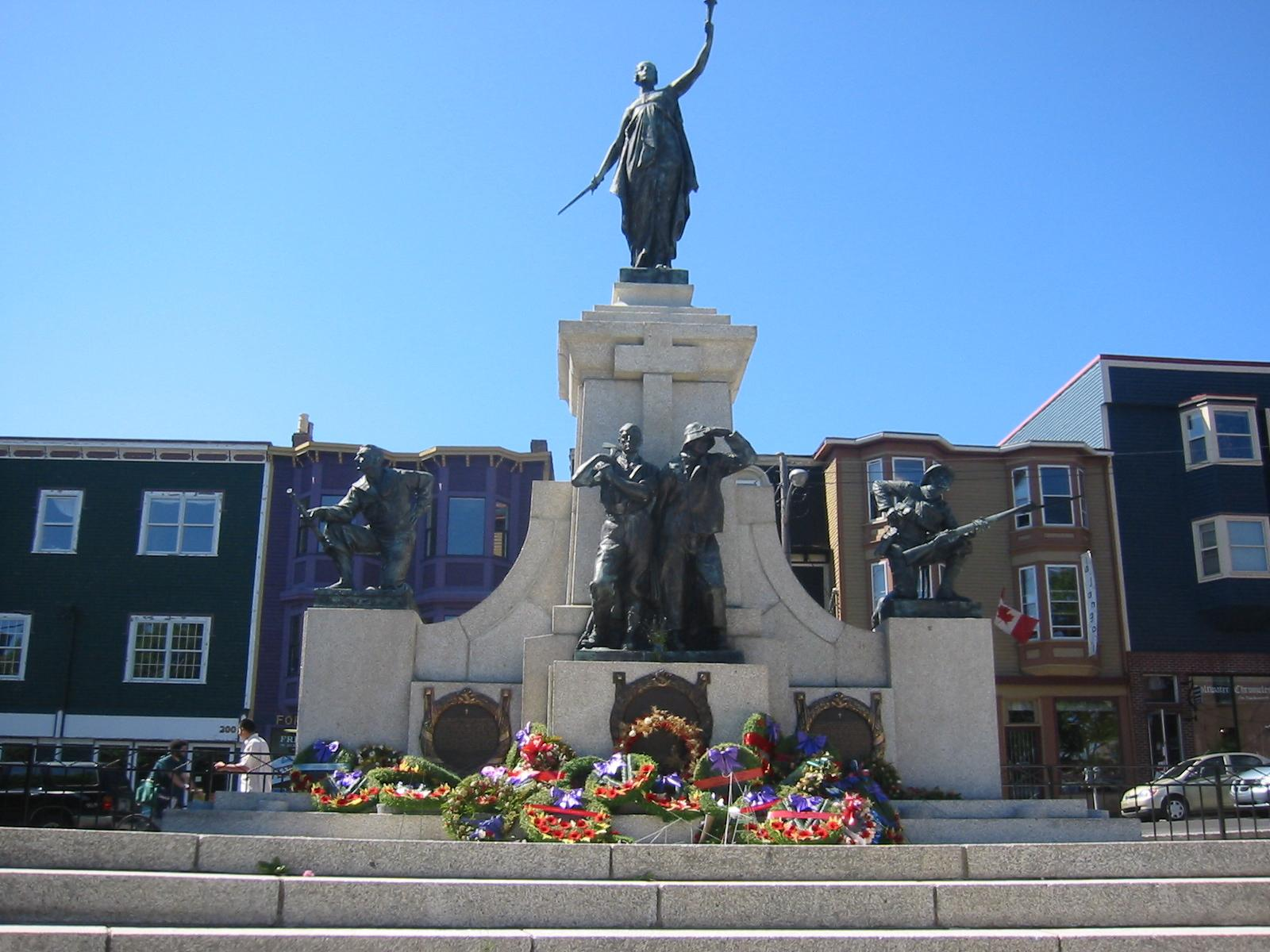
- For soldiers of Dominion of Newfoundland, World War I
- Unveiled: 1 July 1924
- Location: 47°34′03.28″N 52°42′13.67″W; St. John's, Newfoundland and Labrador, Canada
- Designed by: Father Thomas Nangle
- Erected by "a grateful people to honour its war dead"

The National War Memorial is a World War I memorial in downtown St. John's, Newfoundland and Labrador, Canada. It was erected at King's Beach on Water Street where, in 1583, Sir Humphrey Gilbert claimed Newfoundland for England (following John Cabot's 1497 expedition). It was formally unveiled on Memorial Day, 1 July 1924 by Field Marshal Douglas Haig, 1st Earl Haig.

Donations poured in from across the island for the memorial. Construction was supervised by Lieutenant-Colonel Father Thomas Nangle, the Roman Catholic Padre of Royal Newfoundland Regiment and (Ret) Captain Gerald (Gerry) Whitty.

In preparation for the Memorial's centennial, it was refurbished and the Tomb of the Unknown Soldier was added, with Canada's Governor General and Prime Minister in attendance for the ceremony. This is the only time that the Commonwealth War Graves Commission allowed a second tomb for an unknown soldier in the same country. Both tombs inter a soldier who died in the First World War, which took place before the Dominion of Newfoundland became a part of Canada in 1949: the Newfoundland tomb inters a soldier of the Royal Newfoundland Regiment who was previously buried in the Beaumont-Hamel Newfoundland Memorial in France, and the Canadian tomb in the Canadian National War Memorial in Ottawa inters a soldier who fought in the Battle of Vimy Ridge, which Newfoundland was not involved in. About 1,700 Newfoundlanders died in the war; 820 have no known grave.

== Background ==
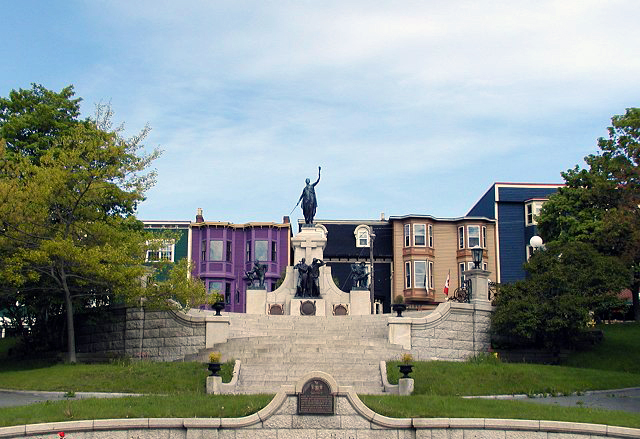
The memorial in 2005

On 1 July, 1916, the Royal Newfoundland Regiment was part of the massive battle known as the Battle of the Somme. They were located in the northern French town of Beaumont-Hamel when they were ordered to charge enemy positions. Within about 30 minutes, 86 percent of the regiment was either dead, missing, or injured. The next morning, out of 800 men, only 68 reported for roll call.

Overall, when the war ended in November 1918, approximately 1,700 Newfoundlanders died in the conflict, with 820 having no known grave. The Great War Veterans' Association and the Newfoundland Patriotic Association launched the campaign to have the National War Memorial established. They developed a committee to establish the design and undertake the fund-raising to pay for the proposed memorial. Construction of the memorial was supervised by Lieutenant-Colonel Father Thomas Nangle, the Roman Catholic Padre of Royal Newfoundland Regiment and (Ret) Captain Gerald (Gerry) Whitty.

== Design ==
The design was semi-circular with a graduated plateau rising from the entrance stairway on Water Street to the cenotaph on Duckworth Street. The area is near where Sir Humprehy Gilbert claimed Newfoundland for England, almost 400 years earlier. Also, the site has a view of the entire harbour, where all the soldiers left for Europe would have passed through during the First World War. The five figures were designed by two English sculptors, Ferdinand Victor Blundstone (top and sides) and Gilbert Bayes (front), and were cast in bronze by E.J. Parlanti of London, England.These figures represent Newfoundland's involvement in World War I.

At the top of the central pedestal is a figure of a woman. She is holding a torch in her left hand and in her right hand, she is holding a sword poised and ready to battle, if she must. From the sides of the central pedestal, two wings of granite protrude. On the west wing, representing the Newfoundlanders who joined the Newfoundland Royal Naval Reserve, is a sailor holding a spyglass. On the east wing, representing the men of the Royal Newfoundland Regiment, is a soldier in full battle gear, loading his rifle, searching the horizon for "the enemy".

Out in front, on the lower pedestal, are fishermen in oilskins and Wellington boots, and a lumberman with his axe slung over his shoulder, symbolizing the Newfoundlanders who served with the Merchant Marine and the Forestry Corps. Over their heads is a granite cross symbolizing the sacred nature of the war memorial. Below, is a bronze plaque stating that the memorial was erected by "a grateful people to honour its war dead". Similar plaques were added on both sides of the pedestal to commemorate the Newfoundlanders who died in World War II, the Korean War, and the War in Afghanistan.

== Unveiling 1924 ==
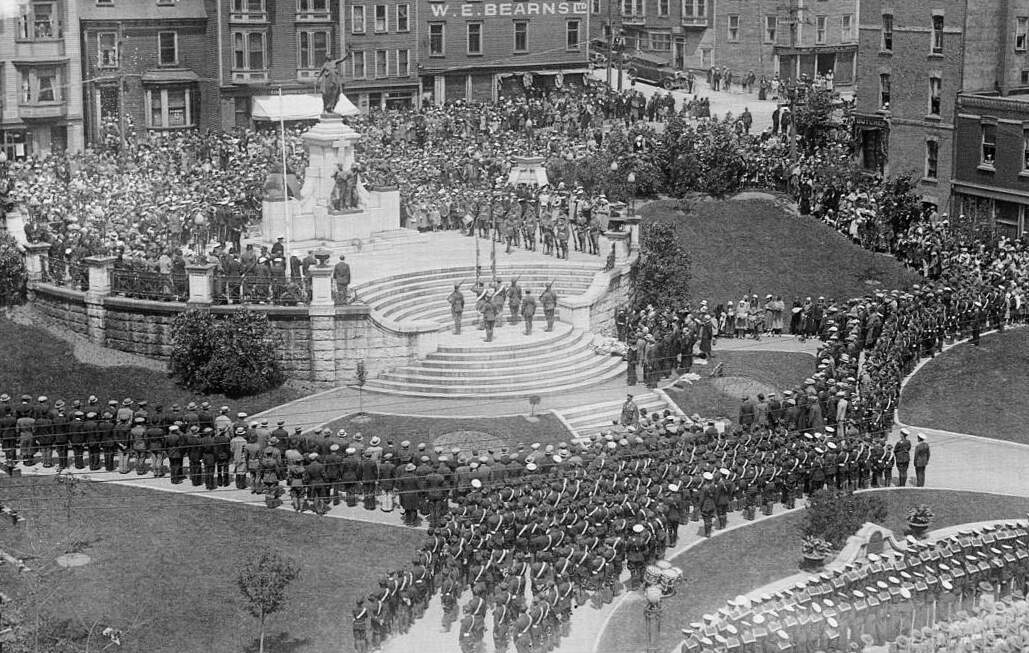
Unveiling on Memorial Day, 1 July 1924

Field Marshal Earl Douglas Haig, the former commander of the British Expeditionary Forces during most of World War One, was asked to be present to unveil the National War Memorial, on 1 July 1924. 20,000 people came out on the warm July day. That crowd represented about 10 percent of the island nation's population.

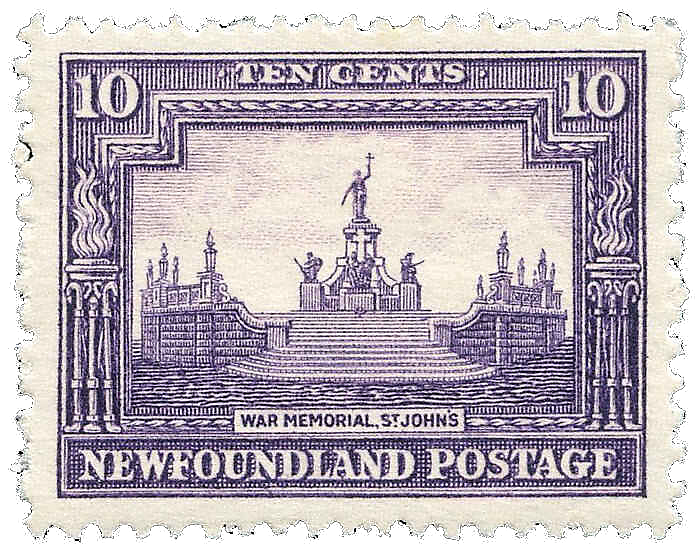

== Centennial and Tomb of the Unknown Soldier ==
In preparation for the centennial and the entombment, the Memorial received a major $6.1 million restoration that brought the sculptures back to their original state, added new accessible walkways and stairs. Another component of the restoration was creating the Tomb of the Unknown Soldier. After originally awarding the contract to create the tomb to a Newfoundland company, Ocean Floor Granite, the government had to cancel the contract in December 2023. Ocean Granite was using materials sourced from Newfoundland and Labrador to create the tomb. A Nova Scotian company, Heritage Memorials, was awarded a new contract in January 2024, and they would use Quebec gabbro for the tomb, but the lid ended up being made from locally sourced anorthosite containing the mineral Labradorite.

Canada now has two tombs for an Unknown Soldier. The other lies at the National War Memorial in Ottawa, just a short distance from Parliament Hill. The Commonwealth War Graves Commission allowed for this second tomb, because the Unknown Soldier in Ottawa was repatriated from the Vimy Ridge Memorial war grave site. That meant that he was a Canadian soldier, and did not represent Newfoundland because the island's regiment was not part of that battle. Newfoundland was its own Dominion at the time of the war and flew its own flag. The Commission granted permission in July 2022.

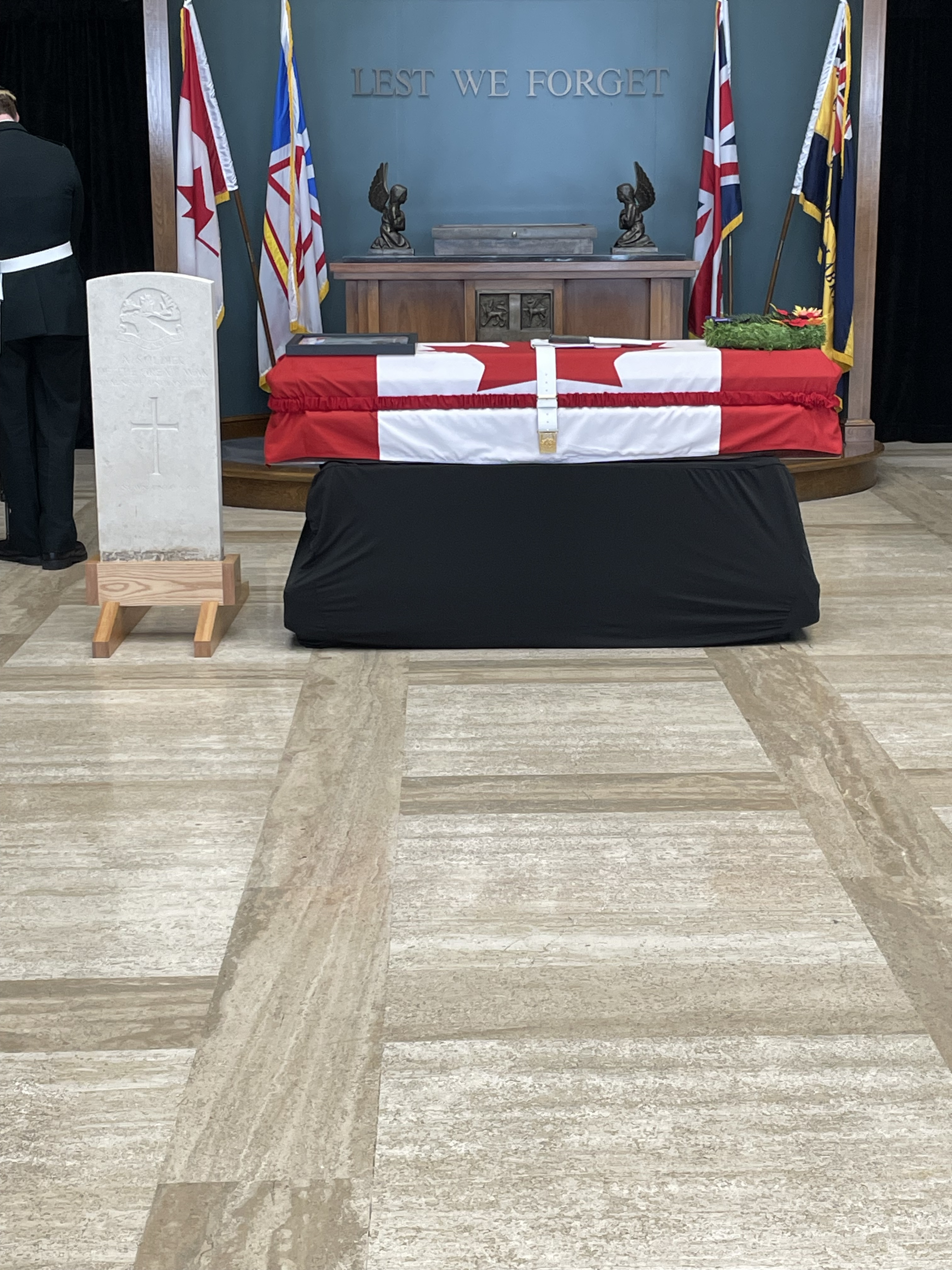
The casket of the Unknown Soldier lies in state at the Confederation Building

The government purposely chose an anonymous grave with many dead in it, so that the Unknown Soldier could represent all of Newfoundland and Labrador. The tomb means that the war memorial is now under the War Graves Commission's protection. The ceremony to repatriate the Royal Newfoundland Regiment soldier took place at the Beaumont-Hamel memorial and cemetery on 25 May 2024. The remains were transported back to St. John's that day, where an honour guard drove it from the airport and visited several important sites along the way, including the National Memorial. At the end of June, the Unknown Soldier's remains were laid in state in the East Block Lobby of the Confederation Building of the Newfoundland and Labrador House of Assembly. On 1 July 2024, an unknown soldier, killed at Beaumont-Hamel, was entombed at the foot of the memorial, in a ceremony attended by Canada's Governor General, Mary Simon; Prime Minister, Justin Trudeau; and the Premier of Newfoundland and Labrador, Andrew Furey. Princess Anne, the colonel in chief of the Royal Newfoundland Regiment and the president of the Commonwealth War Graves Commission, was supposed to be present at the ceremony. Just over a week before the ceremony, she was injured. Buckingham Palace released an official statement that mentioned the trip had to be cancelled because of her injury. Simon represented Princess Anne by reading the royal message at the ceremony. Premier Furey stood in as the ceremonial next of kin for the soldier and received both the ensign flag and the Canadian flag before entombment.

== Ceremonies ==
Each year the memorial is the site of several ceremonies to commemorate those service personnel who died in past wars.

- 25 April, the date of the commemoration of the Gallipoli offensive in World War I
- First Sunday in May, the Battle of the Atlantic is commemorated
- 1 July—Memorial Day—is the date of remembrance of Battle of the Somme at Beaumont-Hamel
- Third Sunday in September, the anniversary of the Battle of Britain is celebrated
- 11 November, is Armistice Day, the anniversary of the official end of World War I

== Legacy ==
In 1928 Newfoundland issued a postage stamp titled 'War Memorial, St. John's', depicting the memorial.
