= Trenton Cenotaph =

Memorial in Trenton, Ontario, Canada

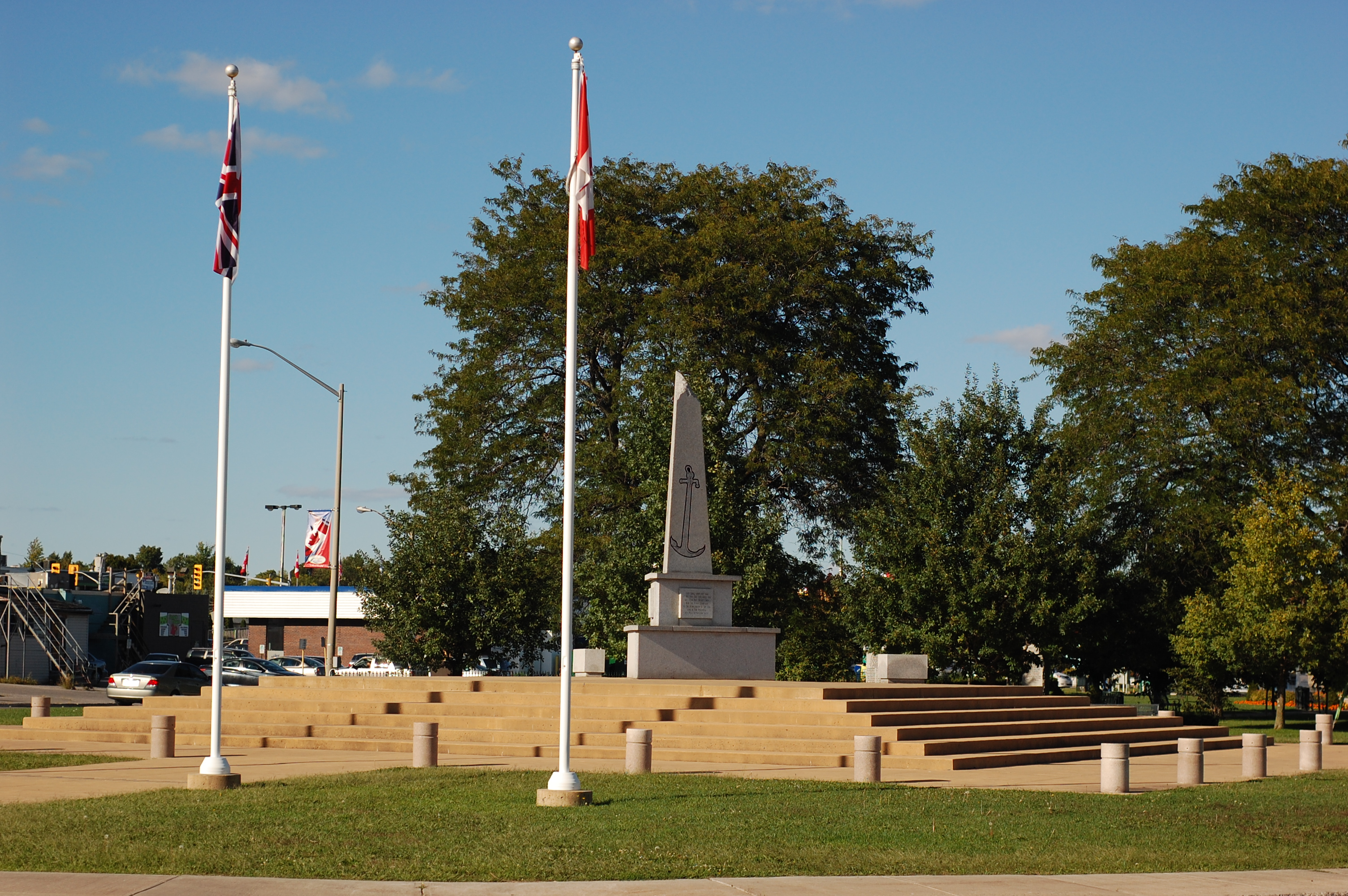
- Interactive map of Trenton Cenotaph
- Location: Trenton, Ontario, Canada
- Coordinates: 44°06′01.44″N 077°34′31.44″W
- Designer: Walter Gregory
- Type: War memorial
- Completion date: 1968
- Dedicated to: World War I, World War II, Korean War

The Trenton Cenotaph is a memorial dedicated to the "fallen of all conflicts" located in Trenton, Ontario, Canada.

== History ==
The cenotaph was originally constructed in 1968, and dedicated at that time to soldiers who had lost their lives in World War I, World War II and the Korean War. It was designed by Walter Gregory and constructed under the supervision of Carl Taylor, funded by the local branch of the Royal Canadian Legion and its Ladies' Auxiliary.

The memorial was rededicated in 1988 in memory of the fallen of all conflicts, with a special memorialization to the lives lost in the sinking of HMCS Trentonian, a ship named for the city of Trenton and lost during World War II.

== Design ==
A broken column suggests lives cut off early. For the 1988 rededication, two benches were added; one for "rededication to the fallen of all conflicts"; the second dedicated to crew of HMCS Trentonian.
