= Gallipoli Newfoundland Memorial =

War memorial at the southwest end of the Gallipoli Peninsula, Turkey

- Canada (formerly Dominion of Newfoundland)
- For the actions of the Royal Newfoundland Regiment during the First World War Gallipoli campaign.
- Established: 13 April 2021
- Unveiled: September 2022
- Location: 40°18′45″N 26°15′07″E near Gallipoli, Turkey
- Gallipoli 1915

The Gallipoli Newfoundland Memorial is a war memorial that commemorates the actions of the Royal Newfoundland Regiment during the Gallipoli campaign, of World War I. Located at the southwest end of the Gallipoli Peninsula, Turkey, near Suvla Bay the memorial commemorates the participation of the Newfoundland Regiment in the landing at Suvla Bay on 20 September 1915 with the 88th Brigade of the 29th Division.

== Memorial ==
The memorial is one of six erected in Europe by the Newfoundland government following the First World War. Four were erected in France at Beaumont-Hamel, Gueudecourt, Masnières and Monchy-le-Preux and the fifth is at Courtrai/Kortrijk in Belgium. A sixth monument, a gift from Major William Howe Greene, OBE, who served with the Newfoundlanders during the war stands in Bowring Park in St. John's, Newfoundland, Canada. The memorials feature are all centrally identical, featuring the emblem of the Royal Newfoundland Regiment, the caribou, cast in bronze, as designed by British sculptor Basil Gotto.

The Gallipoli Memorial is situated 25 metres northwest of Hill 10 Commonwealth War Graves Commission Cemetery in Gallipoli, which is the resting place for eight Royal Newfoundland Regiment soldiers.
