= Monchy-le-Preux (Newfoundland) Memorial =

War memorial in France

Coordinates: 50°16′14″N 2°53′36″E

Monchy-le-Preux Memorial
- Canada (formerly Dominion of Newfoundland)
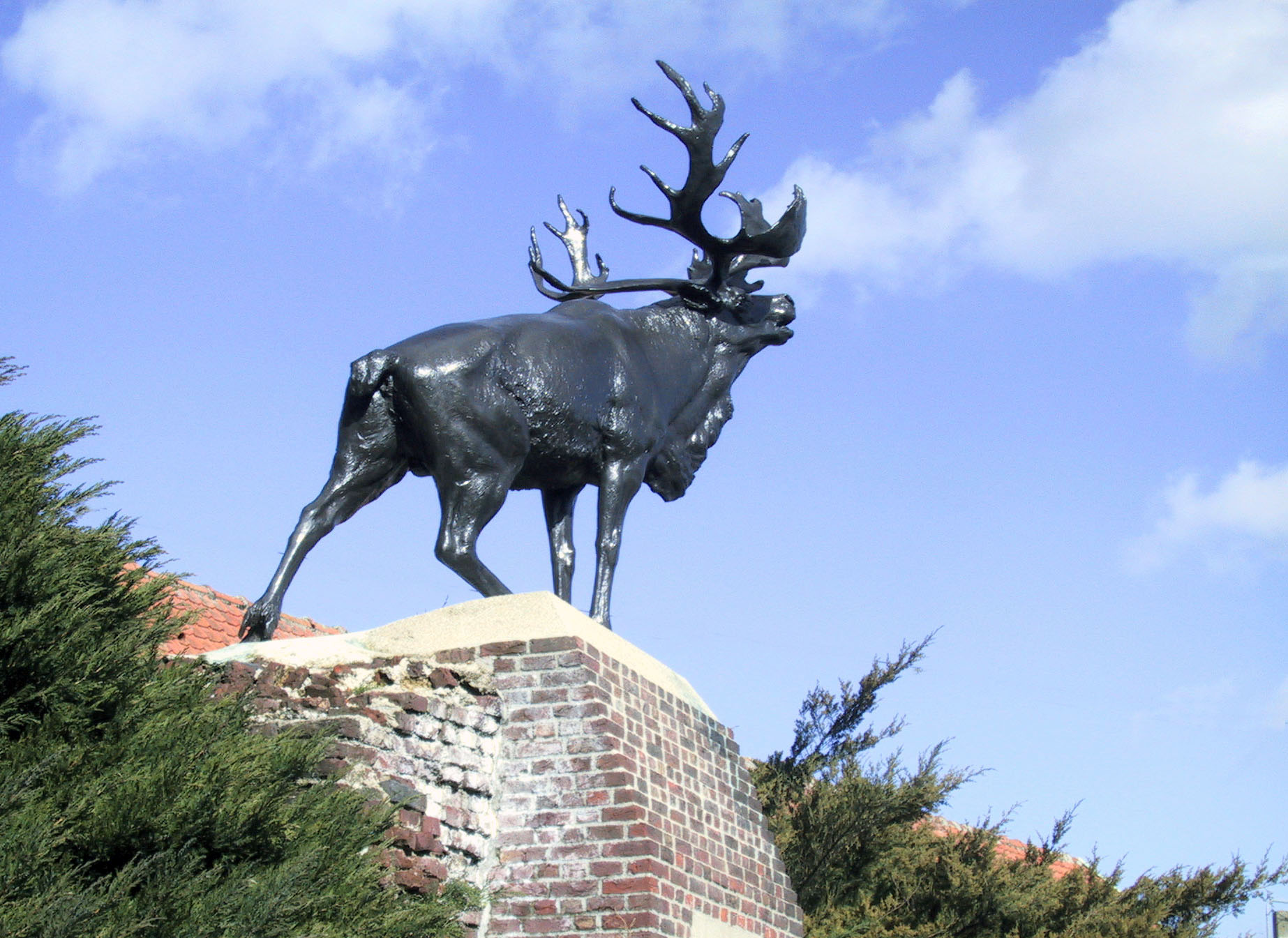
- The Newfoundland Monchy-le-Preux War Memorial
- For the actions of the Royal Newfoundland Regiment during the First World War Battle of Arras.
- Location: near Monchy-le-Preux, France
- Monchy-le-Preux 1917

The Monchy-le-Preux Memorial is a Dominion of Newfoundland war memorial that commemorates the actions of the Royal Newfoundland Regiment during the Battle of Arras of World War I.

== The battle ==
The memorial commemorates an encounter that took place during the 1917 Nivelle Offensive in the Arras Sector in which the British First and Third Armies attacked eastward from Arras on a 22-kilometre front (this was the same offensive that their North American compatriots the Canadian Corps fought at Vimy Ridge). The village of Monchy-le-Preux had been taken in the opening phase of the battle between the 9th and 1 April by troops of the 37th Division in what became known as the First Battle of the Scarpe. To continue the advance eastward the 88th Brigade, which included the Royal Newfoundland Regiment, was to execute a two-battalion attack against an objective known as Infantry Hill to the east of Monchy-le-Preux with the Royal Newfoundland Regiment, commanded by Lieutenant-Colonel James Forbes-Robertson, on the right/south and the 1st Essex Battalion on the left/north of the thrust.

At 5:30 a.m. on 14 April, an artillery barrage was volleyed at the enemy lines and the two battalions began their advance. As the Royal Newfoundland Regiment advanced towards the high ground of Infantry Hill they were subjected to a strong German counterattack which surrounded both the Royal Newfoundland Regiment and the 1st Essex Battalion. By 9:00am the attack had been thoroughly crushed and surviving groups of men who found themselves surrounded were forced to surrender. Although all communication by telephone had been cut by artillery fire, a wounded man from the 1st Essex Battalion managed to make it to battalion headquarters to report that all men in the Essex Battalion and Royal Newfoundlanders had either been killed or captured. The Germans pressed their counterattack, and soon advanced to the edge of Monchy-le-Preux capturing the trenches from which the 1st Essex and the Newfoundlanders had launched their attack.

Lieutenant-Colonel James Forbes-Robertson quickly collected all available men of his headquarters staff, as well as weapons and ammunition from dead and wounded soldiers who could be located, and led twenty men through the shattered streets of Monchy-le-Preux under heavy artillery fire to a small berm on the outskirts of village. Establishing themselves in this shallow ditch, the nine remaining men opened fire on the approaching Germans and kept the Germans ignorant of their pitifully weak numbers. A tenth man who was knocked unconscious joined the other nine an hour and a half later. These ten men held their position for 11 hours until they were finally relieved after dark. After 4 hours they were able to send one of the men several kilometres to the rear to apprise the British of the situation passing on information that allowed for artillery support forward of their position on the berm. A Platoon of Hampshires were sent up and provided infantry support amongst the ruins of Monchy. The British bombardment helped keep the Germans at bay but also killed Newfoundlander and Essex soldiers who had been wounded in the earlier advance and still lay on the battlefield awaiting help.

The heroic action of the "Monchy Ten" Newfoundland men - who at the outset of their advance to hold the lines doubted that they would survive 15 minutes, let alone 11 hours - stopped British planners from suffering a significant embarrassment. Even if the advance of the Essex Men and Newfoundlanders had been successful in capturing the high ground and the new line had been reinforced with reserves to defend the gain, they would have been in a salient, surrounded on three sides by the enemy and perilously susceptible to counter-attack. The poor planning was further illustrated in the fact that reserves had not been brought forward to hold the village against the German counter-attack that came as the British attack collapsed. After having only taken Monchy 3 days before, if the 10 men of the Royal Newfoundland Regiment had faltered in their defense, the Germans could have taken Monchy back at relatively little cost. Considering Monchy's strategic significance on the battlefront and in the overall success of the Battle of Arras, this makes the errors in planning and the improvised actions of "Monchy Ten" all the more incredible.

Total casualties for the Royal Newfoundland Regiment at Monchy-le-Preux numbered 460. 166 were killed or died of wounds, 141 were wounded and 153 became prisoners. The 1st Essex Battalion fared no better and suffered 602 casualties of which 400 were taken prisoner.

== Memorial ==
The Monchy-le-Preux Memorial is one of six erected in Europe by the Newfoundland government following the First World War. It is one of four in France, with the others at Beaumont-Hamel, Gueudecourt and Masnières. Two others stand at Courtrai/Kortrijk in Belgium and at Gallipoli in Turkey. A seventh memorial is situated in Bowring Park in St. John's, Newfoundland, and was a gift from Major William Howe Greene, OBE, who served with the Newfoundlanders during the war.

The central feature of the memorial, British sculptor Basil Gotto's bronze cast of a caribou, the emblem of the Royal Newfoundland Regiment, is identical to the six other memorials. Similar to the others, the caribou faces in the direction from which the Battalion withstood the German attack, a point known at the time as Infantry Hill. However, unlike the other five Newfoundland battlefield memorials in Europe which stand atop cairns of Newfoundland granite and are surrounded by native Newfoundland plants, the Monchy-le-Preux Memorial differs in that it is perched upon the ruins of what was a German bunker.

The memorial is found in the centre of the village, on the north side of Rue de la Chaussy about 30 m (100 ft) west from the D33.
