= Gueudecourt (Newfoundland) Memorial =

War memorial in France

Coordinates: 50°3′54.31″N 2°51′13.24″E

Gueudecourt Memorial
- Canada (formerly Dominion of Newfoundland)
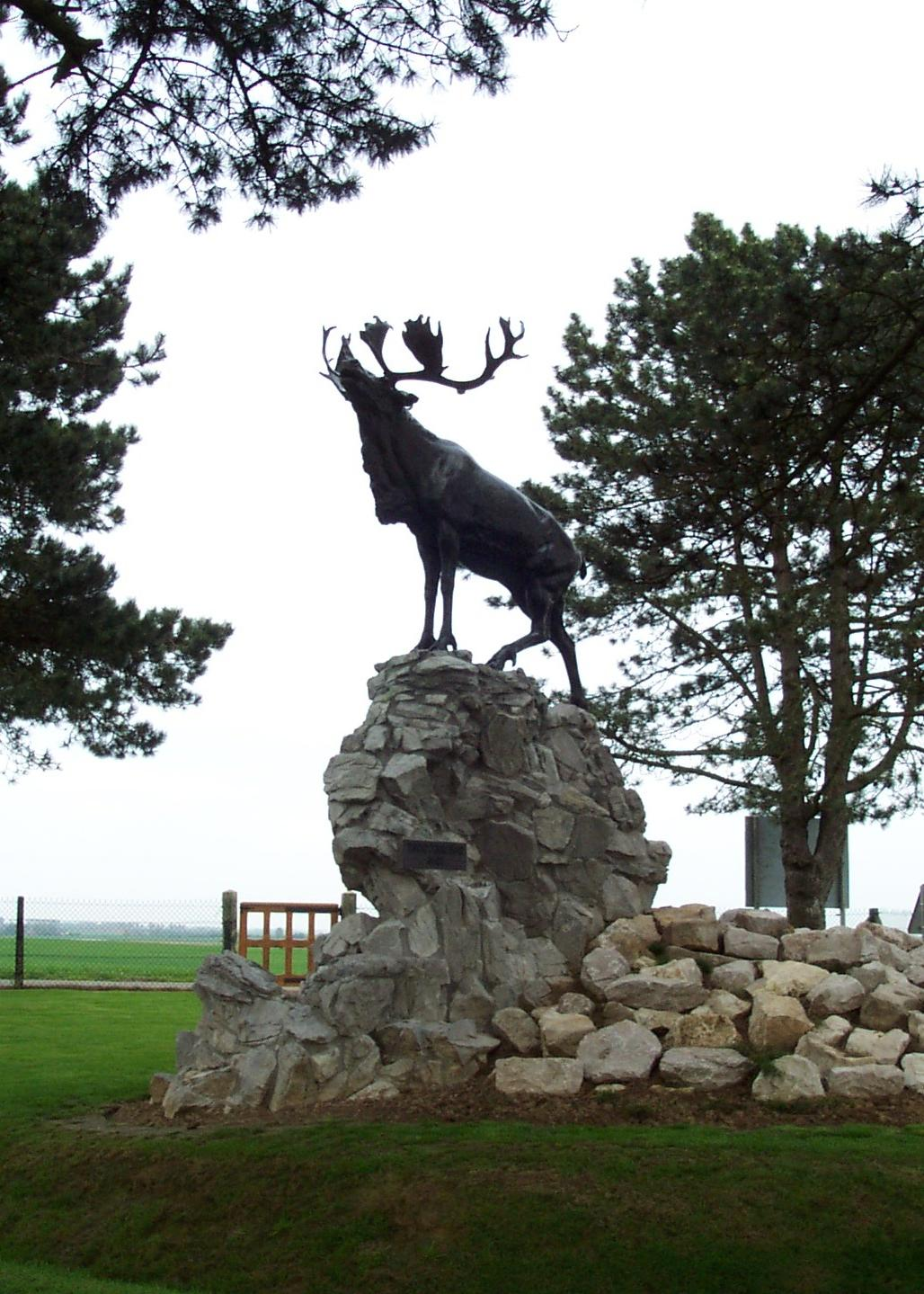
- The Newfoundland Gueudecourt Memorial
- For the actions of the Royal Newfoundland Regiment during the First World War Battle of Le Transloy.
- Location: near Gueudecourt, France
- Gueudecourt 1916

The Gueudecourt Memorial is a Dominion of Newfoundland war memorial that commemorates the actions of the Royal Newfoundland Regiment during the Battle of Le Transloy, a sub-battle of the Battle of the Somme of World War I. Located about 1-kilometre (0.62 mi) north-east of Gueudecourt village, the memorial marks the spot where in October 1916, the Royal Newfoundland Regiment played a decisive role in the capture and holding of a German strong-point. The site also marks the furthest point of advance from the July 1st starting line of all British units during the Battle of the Somme.

== Background ==
Following the huge losses of the First day on the Somme, the Newfoundland Regiment continued to see service, although the regiment remained significantly understrength. After taking on reinforcements, the regiment was back in the front line on 14 July near Auchonvillers. The Newfoundland Regiment along with entirety of the 88th Brigade was transferred to the Ypres Salient on 16 July 1916, which at that time was a quieter portion of the Western Front. A period of recovery coupled with additional reinforcements would eventually help the regiment return to full strength. After spending ten weeks in the Ypres Salient, the 88th Brigade was temporarily attached to the British 12th Division, which was holding Gueudecourt. By nightfall on 10 October, the regiment manned a 450-metre (490 yd) section of the trench on the northern outskirts of the village.

== The battle ==
The attack began at 2:05 pm on 12 October. The regiment advanced in line with the 1st Essex Battalion on their left. The men kept so close to the supporting artillery barrage, that several became casualties from the shrapnel of their own supporting guns. The Germans were compelled by the shelling to remain under cover and as a result were quickly engaged in hand-to-hand fighting. By 2:30 p.m. both assaulting battalions of the 88th Brigade had secured their initial objective, Hilt Trench in the German front line.

As the Newfoundlanders advanced to their final objective, Grease Trench some 750 metres (820 yd) from their starting line, heavy machine-gun fire coming from the front and the right flank forced the regiment back to Hilt Trench. On their left flank, a German counter-attack drove the 1st Essex Battalion back to the outskirts of Gueudecourt, leaving the Newfoundlanders with an open flank. Newfoundland bombing parties cleared and secured the vacated portion of Hilt Trench and as a result doubled the length of the regiment's front line. All ranks began digging in the hard chalk to construct a new firing step and parapet and reverse the former German position.

In the late afternoon the expected German counter-attack developed but Newfoundland small arms fire managed to drive off the German attack. The position was held against further assaults and during the night of 12 October, the arrival of a relieving battalion of the 8th Brigade enabled the Royal Newfoundland Regiment to hand over their responsibilities and go into reserve. During the 55 hours that had elapsed since they had entered the trenches on 10 October, the Newfoundland Regiment had suffered 239 casualties, of whom 120 had been killed or died of wounds. The Regiment was one of the few units on the whole of the British Fourth Army front to capture and retain its objective.

== Memorial ==
The Gueudecourt Memorial is one of six erected in Europe by the Newfoundland government following the First World War. Four were erected in France at Beaumont-Hamel, Gueudecourt, Masnières and Monchy-le-Preux, another is in Courtrai/Kortrijk in Belgium and a sixth in Turkey at Gallipoli. A seventh memorial is situated in Bowring Park in St. John's, Newfoundland, Canada and was a gift from Major William Howe Greene, OBE, who served with the Newfoundlanders during the war.

All of the memorials are centrally identical, featuring the emblem of the Royal Newfoundland Regiment, a caribou, cast in bronze, as designed by British sculptor Basil Gotto. Standing atop a cairn of Newfoundland granite, the caribou faces and calls out in the direction the Newfoundlanders faced toward the enemy during the battle. The cairn is also surrounded by native Newfoundland plants.

The Gueudecourt Memorial is situated on the south-east side the D574 road, about 1-kilometre (0.62 mi) north-east of its namesake village. The memorial site is on ground seized by Newfoundland troops on 12 October 1916 and marks the farthest point of advance by British units from the July 1st front lines during the Battle of the Somme. Clearly visible behind the caribou as seen from the memorial entrance, is a preserved trench line that was part of the British front line of 17 November 1916, the final day of the British offensive at the Somme.
