= Edward Maitland =

Edward Maitland may refer to

- Edward Maitland (writer) (1824–1897), English writer and occultist
- Edward Maitland (RAF officer) (1880–1921), English military aviator
- Edward Maitland, Lord Barcaple (1803–1870), Scottish advocate and judge

== See also ==
- Edward Maitland-Makgill-Crichton (1916–2009), British Army officer
