= General Maitland =

General Maitland may refer to:

- Sir Alexander Maitland, 1st Baronet (1728–1820), British Army general
- Edward Maitland (RAF officer) (1880–1921), British Army brigadier general and later a Royal Air Force air commodore
- Frederick Maitland (1763–1848), British Army general
- Lester J. Maitland (1899–1990), U.S. Army Air Force brigadier general
- Peregrine Maitland (1777–1854), British Army general
- Thomas Maitland (British Army officer) (1760–1824), British Army lieutenant general

== See also ==
- Edward Maitland-Makgill-Crichton (1916–2009), British Army major general
