= 51st (Highland) Division =

Highland Division 51st (Highland) Division 51st (Highland) Infantry Division 51st/52nd (Scottish) Division
- The insignia of the 51st (Highland) Division, during the First World War.
- Active: August 1908 – March 1919; 1920–1946; 1950–1968
- Country: United Kingdom
- Branch: Territorial Army
- Type: Infantry
- Size: Division
- Peacetime HQ: Perth
- Nicknames: First World War: *Harper's Duds; *Ladies from Hell; Second World War: *Highway Decorators
- Engagements: First World War; Battle of the Somme (1916); Battle of Arras (1917); Third Battle of Ypres (1917); Battle of Cambrai (1917); German Spring Offensive; Hundred Days Offensive; Second World War; Battle of France; Second Battle of El Alamein; Allied invasion of Sicily; Normandy Campaign; Operation Veritable; Operation Plunder

Commanders
- Notable commanders: First World War: Major-General George Harper; Second World War: Victor Fortune; Alan Cunningham; Neil Ritchie; Douglas Wimberley; Tom Rennie

The 51st (Highland) Division was an infantry division of the British Army that fought on the Western Front in France during the First World War from 1915 to 1918. The division was raised in 1908, upon the creation of the Territorial Force, as the Highland Division and later 51st (Highland) Division from 1915. The division's insignia was a stylised 'HD' inside a red circle. Early doubts about the division's performance earned it the nickname of "Harper's Duds" after the name of its commander, Major-General George Harper, although they would go on to gain a fearsome reputation with the Allies and Germans.

The division was renamed the 51st (Highland) Infantry Division and fought during the Second World War as part of the Territorial Army after the Territorial Force was disbanded in 1920. In June 1940, the 51st (Highland) Infantry Division was attached to French 10th Army and after a fighting retreat from the Somme the greater part of the division was forced to surrender, having been cut off at Saint-Valery-en-Caux on the Channel coast. In North Africa, the reconstituted Highland Division was nicknamed the "Highway Decorators" in reference to the 'HD' insignia that adorned road signs along their axis of advance.

In December 1947, the formation was amalgamated with 52nd (Lowland) Infantry Division to become 51st/52nd Scottish Division, but, by March 1950, 51st Division and 52nd Division had been recreated as separate formations. 51st (Highland) Division finally disbanded in 1968.

== Formation ==
The Territorial Force (TF) was formed on 1 April 1908 following the enactment of the Territorial and Reserve Forces Act 1907 (7 Edw.7, c.9), which combined and re-organised the old Volunteer Force, the Honourable Artillery Company and the Yeomanry. On formation, the TF contained 14 infantry divisions and 14 mounted yeomanry brigades. One of the divisions was the Highland Division. In peacetime, the divisional headquarters was at 2 Charlotte Street in Perth.

== First World War ==
The First World War doubts were the result of the way in which the division was initially plundered in late 1914 to early 1915, during a period of great strain on the Regular Army troops of the original British Expeditionary Force (BEF), serving on the Western Front. In August 1914, upon mobilization, the division's infantry element had comprised 12 battalions in 3 regimentally-named brigades: the Seaforth and Cameron Brigade, the Gordon Highlanders Brigade and the Argyll and Sutherland Highlanders Brigade. A crisis on the Western Front in late 1914 saw increasing numbers of individual TF battalions being seconded to Regular Army formations on the Western Front. The first TF formation to be plundered in this way was the 1st London Division.

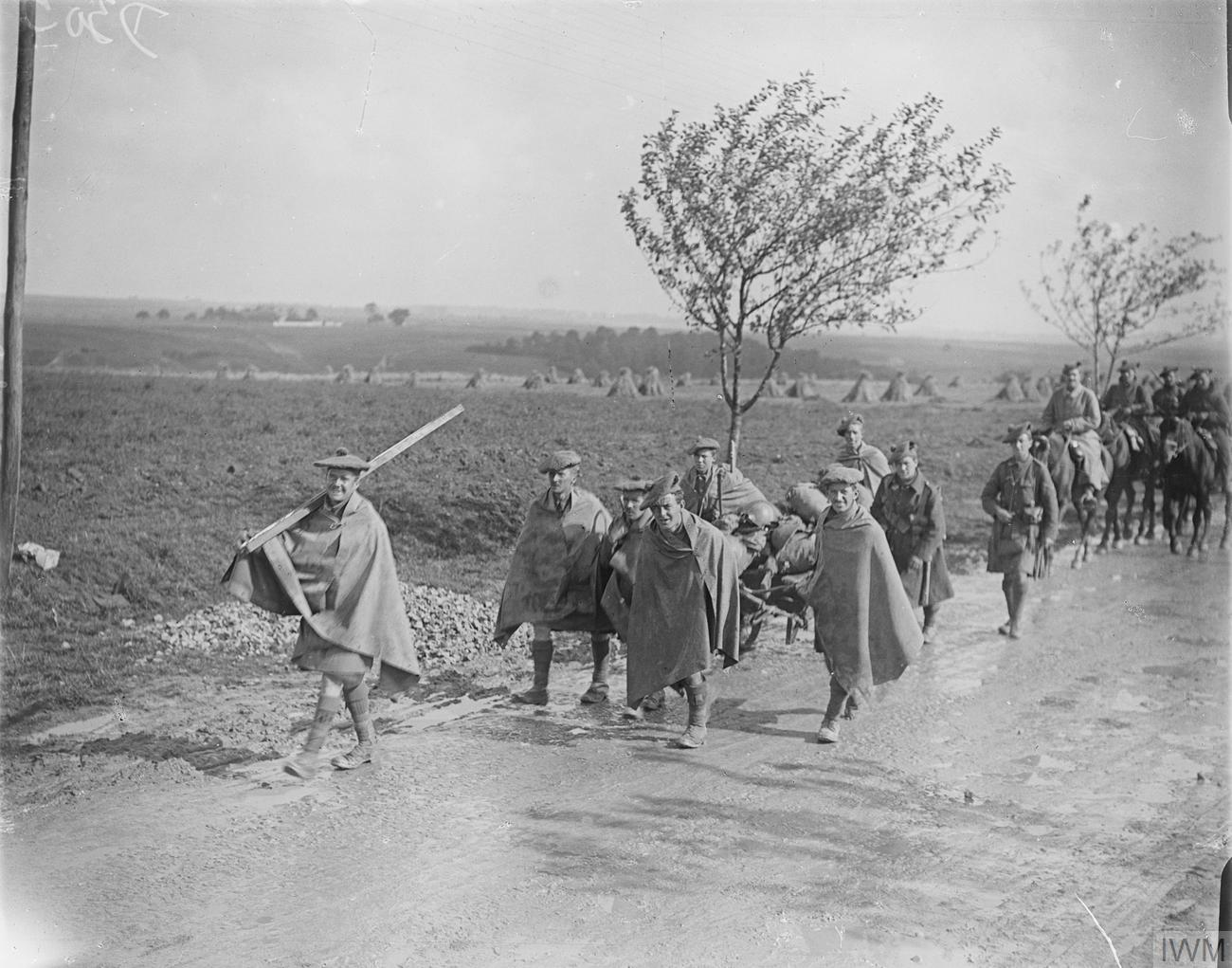
Troops of the 1/9th (Highlanders) Battalion, Royal Scots marching in wet weather along the Amiens-Albert road, France, September 1916.

By early 1915, the Highland Division had lost six of its 12 pre-war Highland infantry battalions to Regular divisions. When TF divisions were finally ordered overseas as complete formations in their own right in early 1915, the Highland Division was only at half-strength and in no shape to be sent abroad at that time. Only by the last-minute addition of two Black Watch (Royal Highlanders) battalions and the North Lancashire Brigade from the West Lancashire Division was the division, now numbered as the 51st (Highland) Division, considered numerically complete and was rushed to the Western Front in May 1915 to help stem the latest German onslaught during the Second Battle of Ypres. Obviously, the lack of familiarity amongst these newly introduced disparate units hampered division efficiency and the division could only fare moderately in the further actions at Festubert and Givenchy. Lieutenant General Sir Douglas Haig, then commanding the British First Army, and later to command the entire BEF, commented that the 51st was, at the time of Festubert, "practically untrained and very green in all field duties". Moved to the quiet Somme front in the late summer of 1915, the division, now under the command of Major General George Harper, had yet to satisfy the expectations of those expecting the familiar Highland flair– this was the period of Harper's Duds.

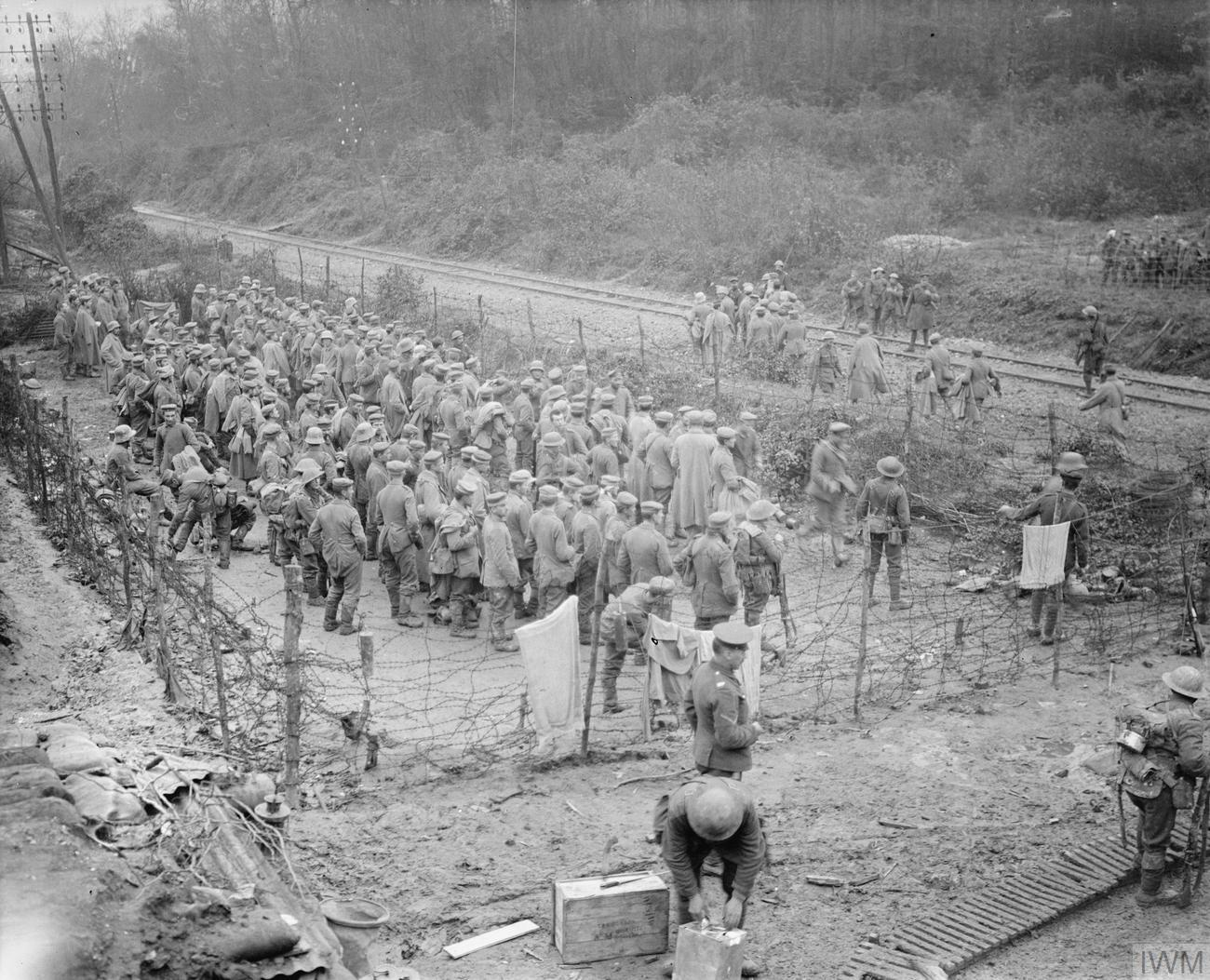
Prisoners taken in Beaumont Hamel, France, during the Battle of the Ancre, by the 51st (Highland) Division, 13 November 1916.

The situation was only resolved when, in January 1916, the Lancashire Brigade (by then renumbered the 154th (3rd Highland) Brigade and later became the 164th (North Lancashire) Brigade) left the division and their place was filled by original Highland battalions released by the regular divisions and by battalions of the Black Watch (Royal Highlanders) not originally in the division. Given the chance to show their mettle in July 1916, during the Battle of the Somme, they assaulted High Wood, which they attacked forcefully in the midst of a murderous field of fire without shelter. Though they failed to take the position, they had shown the fighting spirit expected of Highlanders. The division's reputation grew and they were chosen to capture the notorious fortress village of Beaumont-Hamel in November 1916, towards the end of the Somme offensive. The 51st were "Harper's Duds" no longer. Legend has it the Germans came to know them as "The Ladies From Hell".

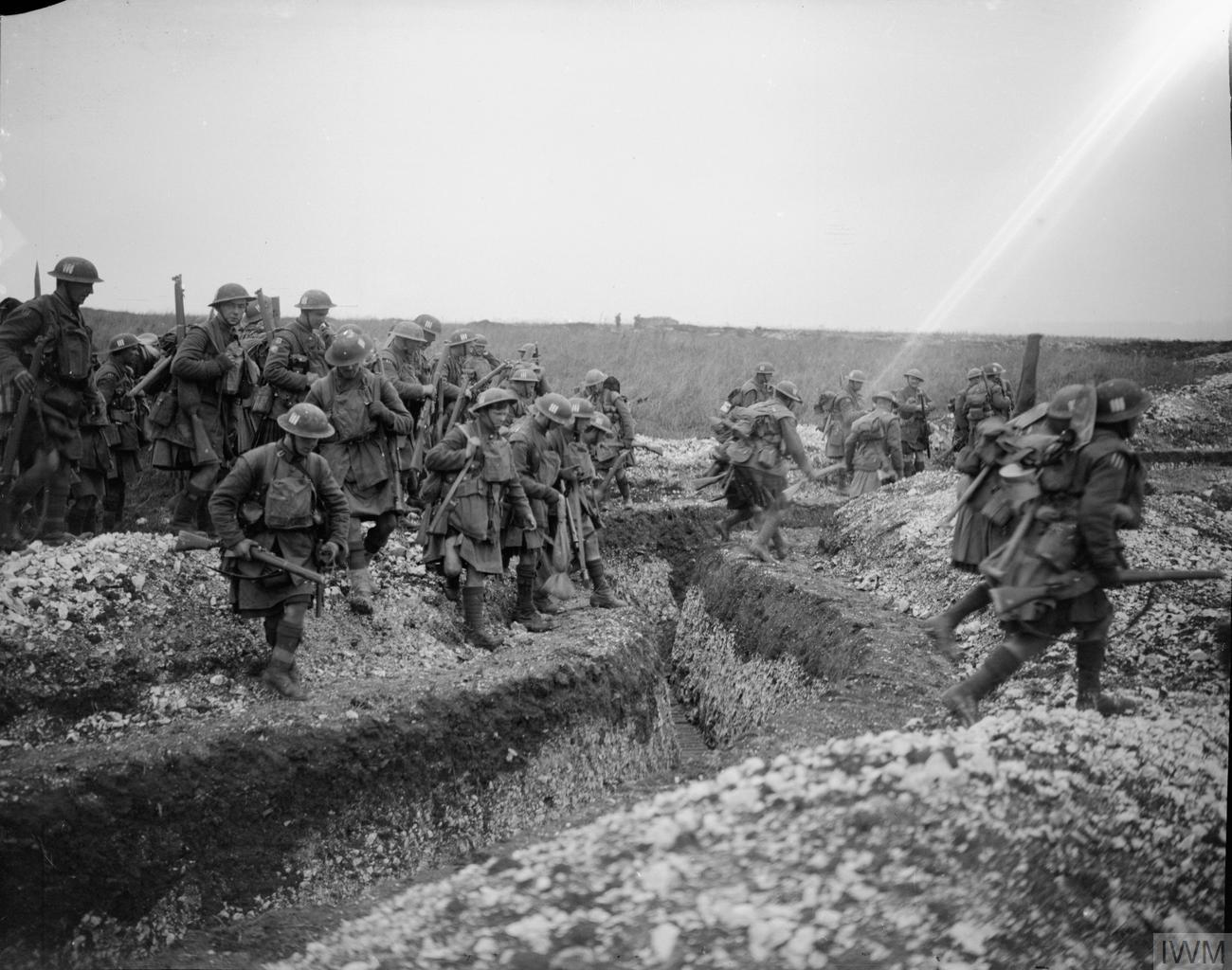
Men of the 1/4th Battalion, Gordon Highlanders, crossing a trench, Ribecourt, France, 20 November 1917.

By 1917, the 51st was considered a leading assault division and was handed more and more difficult tasks, throughout the year, from Arras in April/May to the combined tank-infantry assault at Cambrai in November.

By early 1918, the division, as with numerous others in the BEF at the time, was below-strength due to losses in 1917 and the tired survivors were given a quiet part of the front line to hold. Unfortunately, the Germans had by chance chosen that location as one of the focal points for their Kaiserschlacht, the last great German assault on the West in March 1918, intended to win the war before the American Expeditionary Forces could arrive in great numbers. The neighbouring Portuguese Expeditionary Corps bore the brunt of the initial German assault. When Portuguese troops started to retire from their positions and ran across the 51st's positions, they were mistaken for Germans in the poor visual conditions and the 51st opened fire on them, causing casualties. The under-strength 51st was also pushed back, but eventually held as the German offensive ebbed and flowed. The remains of the division survived the Spring battles and received replacements in time for Haig's Allied offensives of August 1918 onward, which saw the war coming to an end on 11 November 1918.

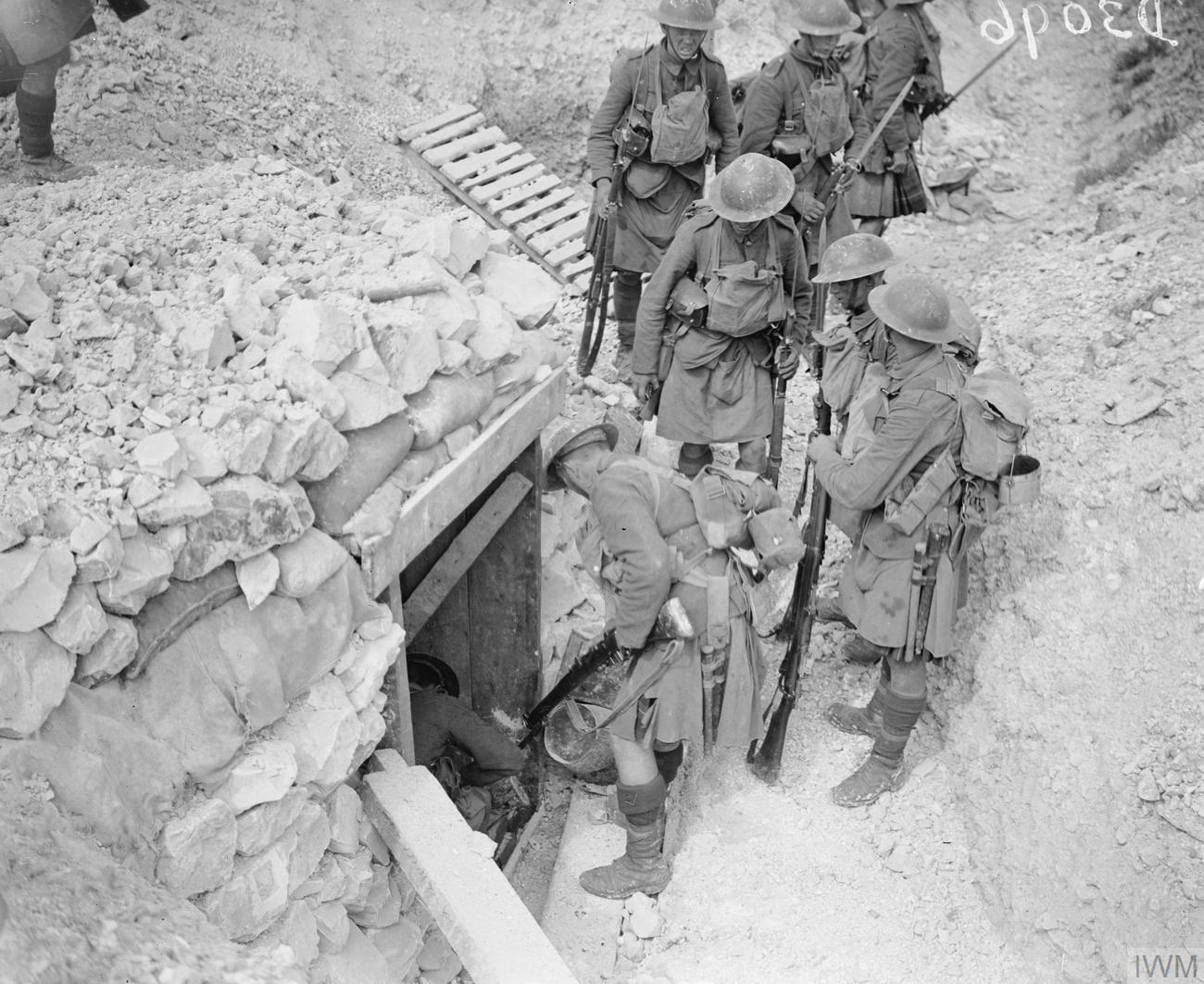
Battle of the Scarpe. Capture of the Greenland Hill by the 51st Division. Daylight patrol of the 1/6th Battalion, Seaforth Highlanders, working forward towards Hausa and Delbar Woods. North-east of Roeux, 29 August 1918. Troops firing into a dug-out in a deserted German trench to dislodge any remaining Germans.

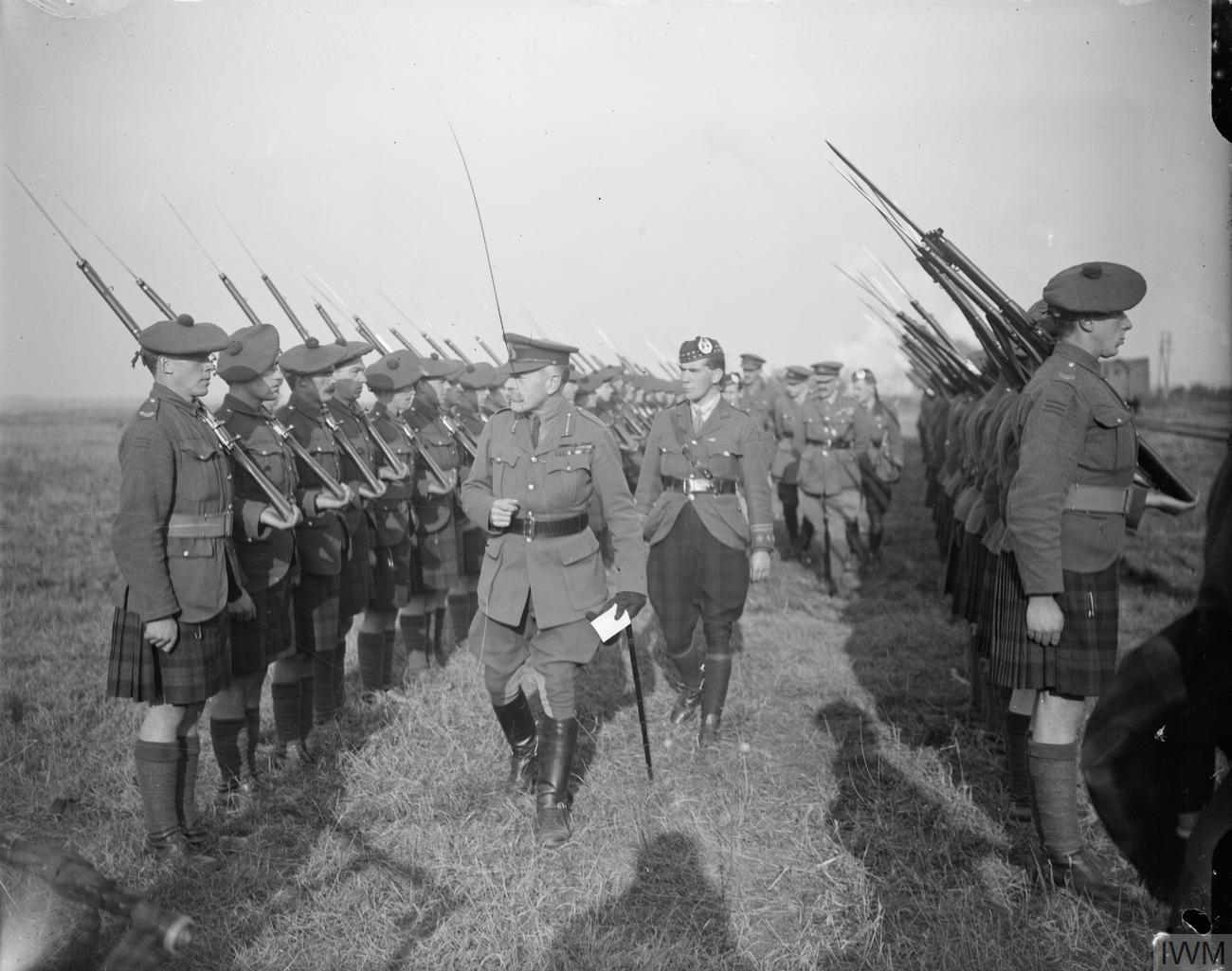
Field Marshal Sir Douglas Haig inspecting the guard of honour of "C" Company, 1st/6th Battalion, Gordon Highlanders in preparation for the visit of Marshal Ferdinand Foch to the British advanced GHQ at Iwuy, 15 November 1918.

During 1918, members of the division were painted by the war artist Frederick Farrell, in France.

== Inter-war period ==
At the end of the First World War, the Territorial Force was stood down. It was reconstituted as the Territorial Army in 1921, resulting in the creation of the 51st (Highland) Infantry Division.

== Second World War ==
The divisional insignia worn following 1940.

=== France 1940 ===
Major-General Victor Fortune took command of the division in 1937. In common with the rest of the British Army at the time, training and equipment had been insufficient in the years after World War 1. In 1938, after Chamberlain's visit to Munich, the decision had been taken to double the size of the Territorial Army, and the Highland Division had made good progress with this recruitment by the spring of 1939.

The issue of equipment and the associated training remained a problem. For example: two years of regular army infantry training was compressed into three months; some mortar units had no experience with live ammunition until they got to the firing ranges in France; Bren gun carrier crews only received their equipment in the summer of 1939, leaving little time for training in operating and tactics.

With the situation regarding Nazi Germany deteriorating and the threat of war on the rise, the 51st (Highland) Infantry Division was mobilised on 24 August 1939. In preparation for joining the BEF in France, the division travelled from Scotland to Aldershot, where it received final equipping and training. All units had arrived at Aldershot by 16 September 1939. The men were required to wear the standard British Army battledress of the day. The War Office had decided that kilts were not suited to modern mechanised warfare and did not provide protection in the event of a gas attack. Thus, the men were required to hand in their kilts before embarking for France.

In mid-January 1940, the division departed from Southampton and disembarked at the French port of Le Havre. On 28 January, it came under command of I Corps of the British Expeditionary Force (BEF), under Lieutenant-General Michael Barker. His command also included the 1st and 2nd Infantry Divisions, both Regular Army formations.

In February and March, the 51st Division underwent a major reorganisation as per policies of the BEF. Some of the division's units were replaced by Regular Army formations. This was done with the intention of strengthening inexperienced Territorial divisions. The 23rd Field Regiment of the Royal Artillery, a Regular Army unit, replaced the 76th (Highland) Field Regiment, Royal Artillery, as one example of the changes made. The 76th (Highland) Field Regiment, Royal Artillery was transferred to the 3rd Infantry Division. In early 1940, British formations facing neutral Belgium were posted to the French Army to gain experience on the frontier with Germany. At first, single brigades were sent, but it was decided that whole divisions would be sent and, on 22 April 1940, the 51st Division was detached from the rest of the BEF to come under command of the French Third Army. The division was stationed in front of the Ouvrage Hackenberg fortress of the Maginot Line.

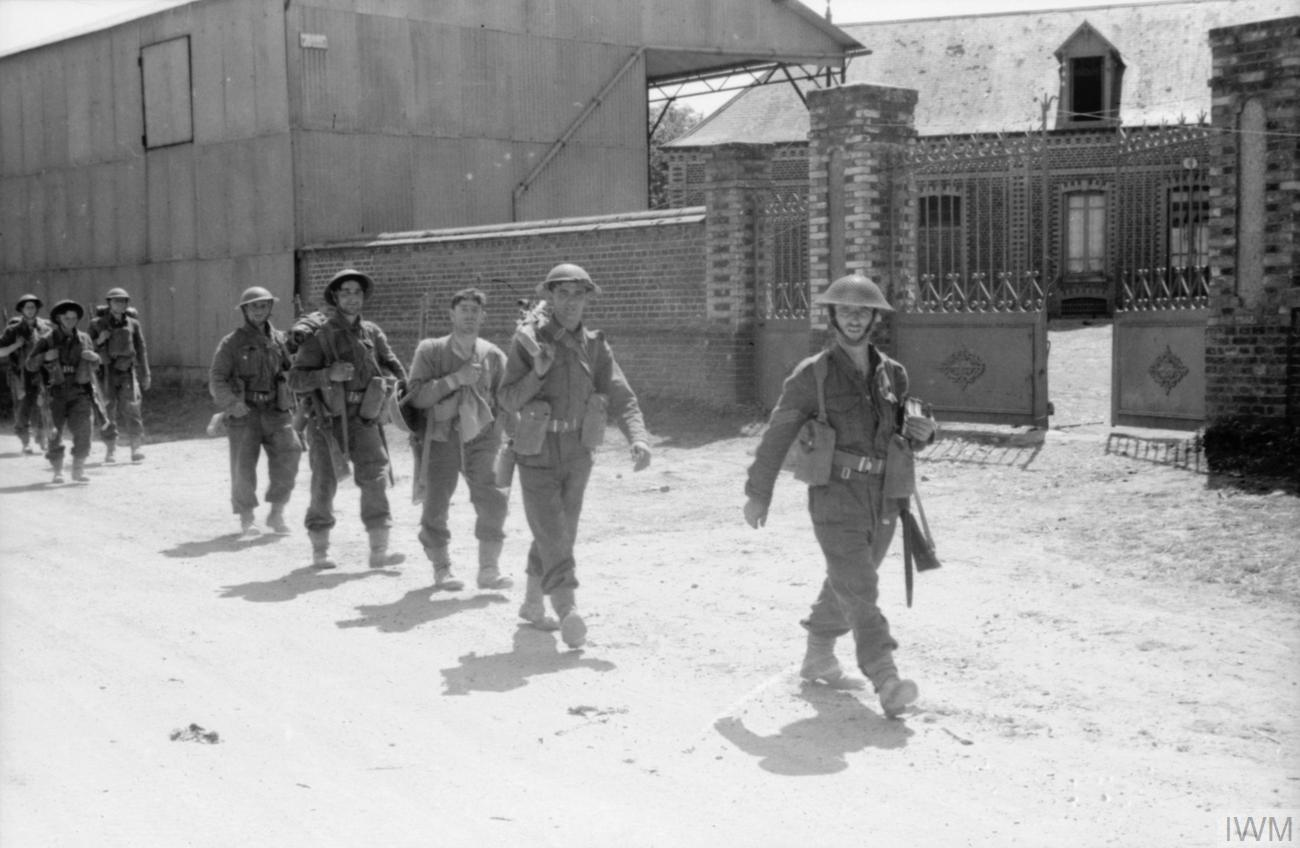
Men of the 7th Battalion, Argyll and Sutherland Highlanders, marching in Millebosc, France, 8 June 1940.

With the German invasion of France and the low countries on 10 May 1940, the BEF advanced into Belgium to meet the advancing German forces. Stationed to the south in front of the Maginot Line, the 51st Division was not a part of the force involved in Belgium, and was thus not involved in the Dunkirk evacuation. In response to the German advance, it was pulled back to form a defensive line along the Somme, where it was attached to the French Tenth Army. With the withdrawal of Allied forces at Dunkirk, the Germans turned their attention to the south.

On 5 June, they began their second offensive. The 51st was tasked with holding a line four times longer than that which would normally be expected of a division. Sustained attacks over 5–6 June caused heavy losses, particularly among the 7th Battalion, Argyll and Sutherland Highlanders, where the main weight of the German attack fell. The Argylls' losses were the worst they had suffered in their history. The other battalions of the 154th Brigade were enveloped. The remnant of the 154th Brigade was forced to retire to the west.

Meanwhile, the 152nd and 153rd Brigades, along with the French 9th Corps, under Lieutenant General Marcel Ihler, were cut off from the main Allied forces, and had to withdraw toward Le Havre for a possible evacuation by sea. The 154th Brigade was detached to form "Arkforce" and tasked with maintaining an open line of communication with Le Havre. As the force moved back toward the coast, German forces reached the coast area near Saint-Valery-en-Caux first, cutting off the line of retreat to Le Havre. 11,000 men of Arkforce were successfully evacuated from Le Havre in Operation Cycle on 13 June.

The remaining French and British force pulled back into Saint Valery-en-Caux. With steep cliffs overlooking the small harbour, the Germans had a ready line of fire to use against any attempts to withdraw. General Fortune could not hold out much longer, and realized their last chance was to be pulled off in the dark on the night of 11/12 June, but no ships came: the Commander-in-Chief, Portsmouth, Admiral William James, had assembled ships for the evacuation but daytime evacuation was impossible and on the final night fog meant that the ships could not communicate and co-ordination would be impossible. On the morning of 12 June, the French forces surrendered, followed 30 minutes later by the British. Major-General Fortune was one of the most senior British officers to be taken prisoner in the war.

After the war was over, General Fortune was knighted by King George VI for his work in promoting the welfare of his men while in captivity: despite failing health, he had resisted repatriation. From the British point of view, the defeat of the 51st (Highland) Infantry Division was the end of the Allied resistance during the Battle of France.

More than 10,000 members of the 51st (Highland) Infantry Division were taken prisoner at St Valery. They were marched to Germany, via Belgium, following the route over which the Germans had advanced against them. The officers were separated from the men, for most of whom the initial destination was Stalag XX-A at Toruń, about 120 miles (190 km) northwest of Warsaw. Some were loaded into canal barges for part of their journey, but all eventually travelled by train in cattle wagons. There were some notable escapes, mostly in the early stages of the march. Of the 290 British Army POW escapers who had returned to Britain by the end of June 1941, 134 were members of the 51st (Highland) Infantry Division.

As other camps were brought into operation, a large proportion of the POWs were transferred – most to Stalag XX-B at Malbork and Stalag 344 at Lambinowice, but with small numbers in many other camps. (Note: A search of the British Prisoners of War database for East Surrey Regiment POWs (2nd/6th attached to the 51st in the closing days of the campaign) gives 133 in Stalag 344, 98 in Stalag XX-B, 52 in Stalag VII-A, 52 in Stalag VIII-B, 50 in Stalag XX-A and smaller numbers in other camps. The same process can be carried out with the unit name of any other unit captured at St Valery with broadly similar results. The search cannot precisely identify those captured at St Valery, but is broadly indicative of the position.)

Early in 1945, the Russian Army had advanced close to these camps, so the POWs were involved in the March of 1945. Some groups from Stalag XX-A marched around 450 miles (720 km) in the depths of winter to Stalag XIB/357 at Bad Fallingbostel on the Lüneburg Heath, north of Hanover. Others had similar journeys in severe winter conditions, affected by shortages of food and shelter, with many suffering from dysentery and frostbite.

In 1942, French General Charles de Gaulle, in a speech, claimed "I can tell you that the comradeship in arms experienced on the battlefield of Abbeville in May and June 1940 between the French armoured division which I had the honour to command and the valiant 51st Highland Division under General Fortune played its part in the decision which I took to continue fighting on the side of the Allies unto the end, no matter what the course of events."

On 12 June 2010, veterans of the 51st (Highland) Infantry Division attended a commemorative ceremony for the 70th Anniversary of the battle at Saint-Valéry-en-Caux.

=== Reformation ===
In August 1940, the 9th (Highland) Infantry Division (the 51st (Highland) Infantry Division's 2nd Line Territorial Army duplicate, which it had helped form) was re-designated as the 51st (Highland) Infantry Division. As part of this, the 26th and 27th Infantry Brigades were re-designated the 152nd and 153rd Infantry Brigade. The 28th Infantry Brigade was merged with the severely understrength 154th Infantry Brigade.

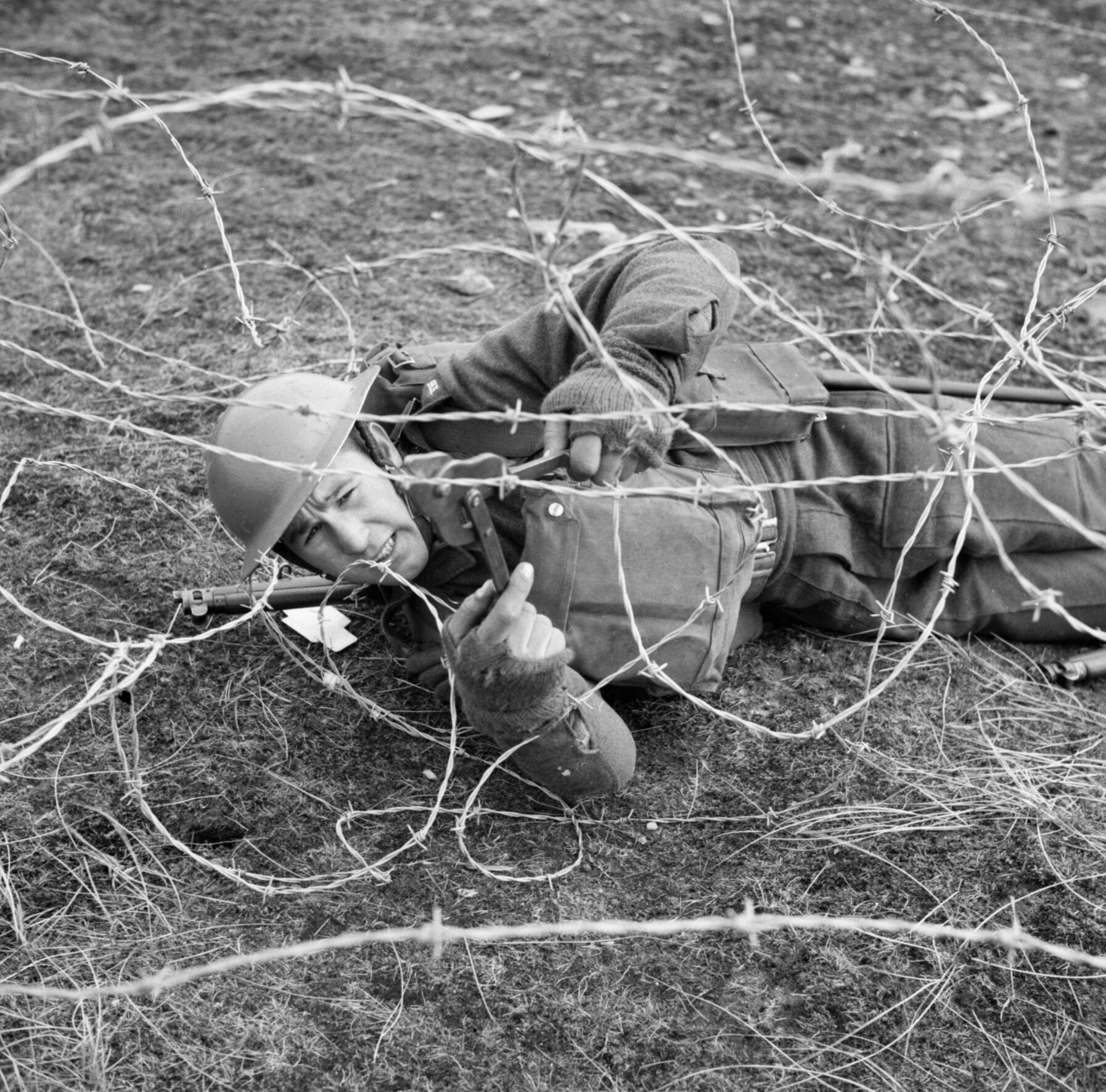
A soldier of the 7th Battalion, Black Watch, cuts through barbed wire during training at Sumburgh in the Shetland Islands, Scotland, 20 April 1941.

The first general officer commanding (GOC) of the new incarnation of the division was Major-General Alan Cunningham, who, in October 1940, was sent to the Middle East. He was replaced by Major-General Neil Ritchie. Almost two years of home defence and training duties followed on the south coast of England and northeast coast of Scotland against a potential German invasion, which never arrived.

In June 1941, Major-General Ritchie was sent to the Middle East and Major-General Douglas Wimberley, who had served with the original 51st (Highland) Division during the First World War and more recently commanded the 152nd Brigade, assumed command. With the arrival of Wimberley as GOC, strenuous training for future operations overseas began. By June 1942, the division was ordered to prepare for service overseas.

=== The Mediterranean and Middle-East ===
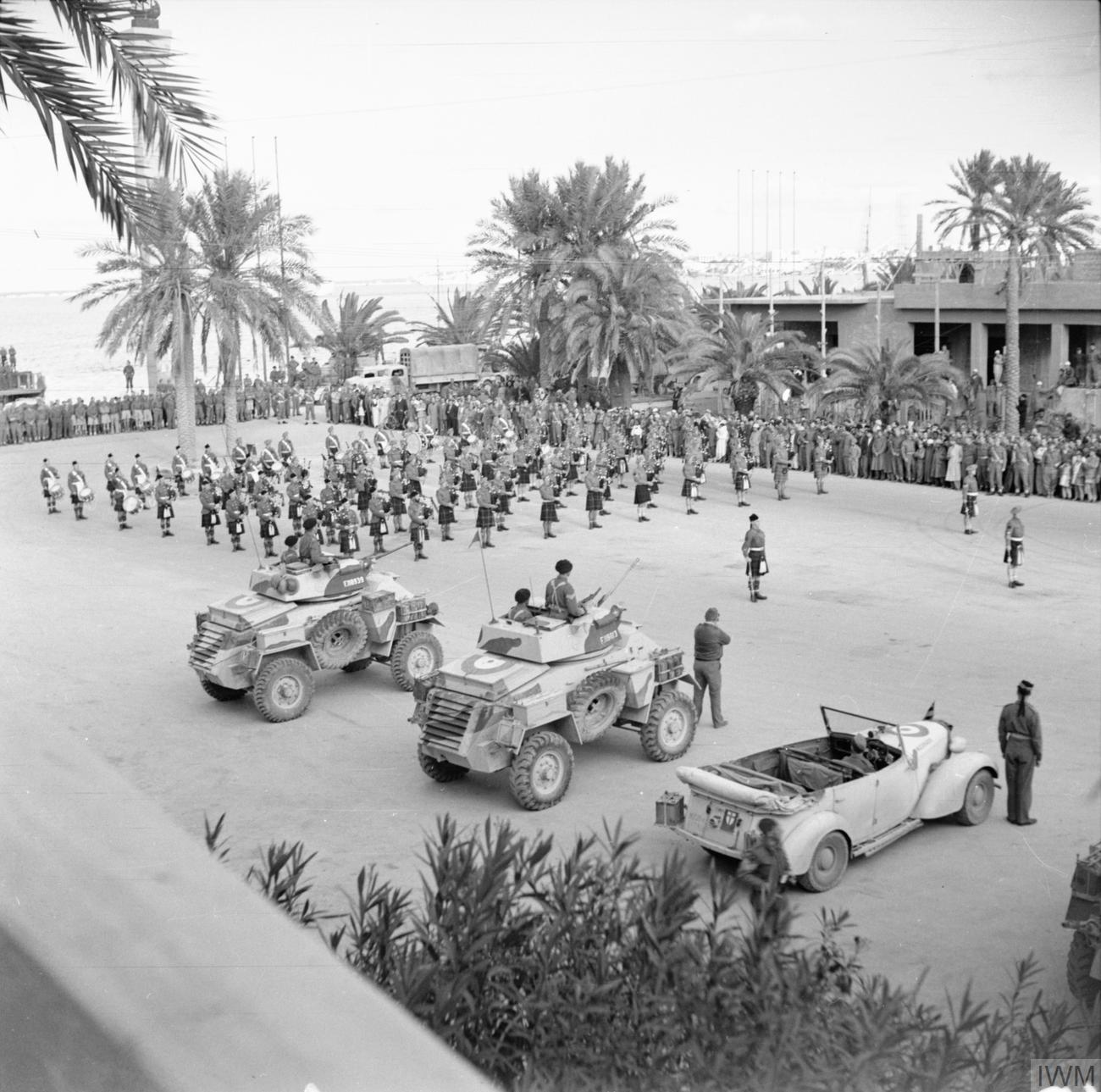
The band of 51st Highland Division plays in the main square in Tripoli during a review by General Montgomery, 28 January 1943. Two Humber Mk III armoured cars can be seen in the foreground.

Arriving in North Africa in August 1942, the 51st (Highland) Infantry Division experienced its first fighting at the Second Battle of El Alamein (October–November), sustaining some 2,000 casualties. It then played a major part in Operation Lightfoot, where it was in the centre of the Northern Push, between the 9th Australian Division and the 2nd New Zealand Division. It faced the German 21st Panzer Division and some Italian units. Initially unsuccessful during Lightfoot, the minefields it cleared were key in achieving a breakout during Operation Supercharge.

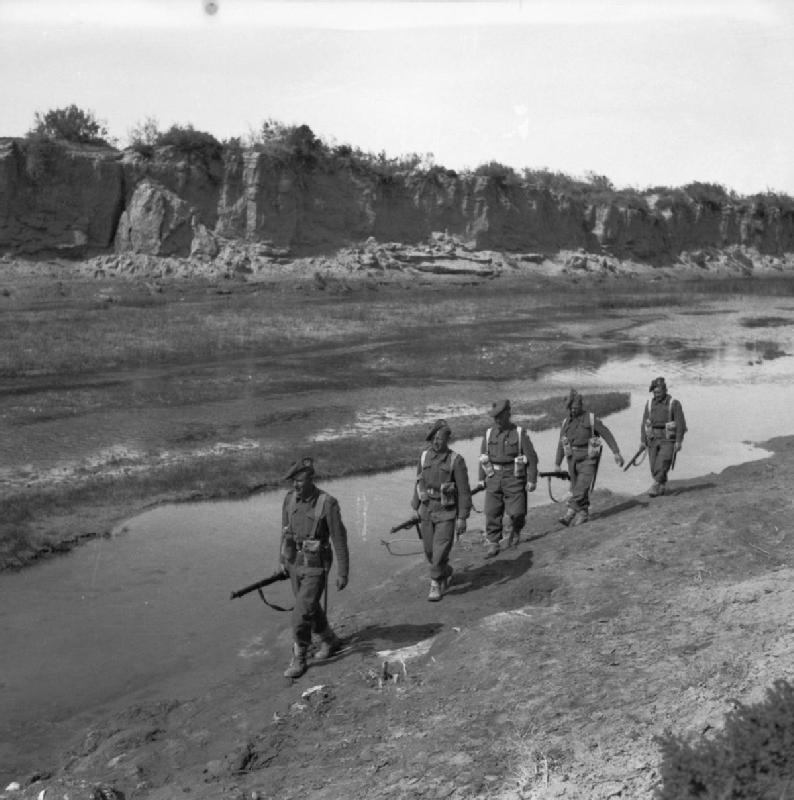
Men of the 5th/7th Battalion, Gordon Highlanders, on patrol in Wadi Zessar, Tunisia, 10 March 1943.

Subsequently, the division was involved in many battles of the Tunisian Campaign, including the battle of Wadi Akarit, in early April 1943, and took part in the frontal assault on strongpoints guarded by deep minefields, where it was on the far right of the line. The Commanding Officer (CO) of the 7th Battalion, Argyll and Sutherland Highlanders, Lieutenant Colonel Lorne MacLaine Campbell, was awarded the Victoria Cross for his leadership during the battle. The war in North Africa ended on 13 May 1943 with the surrender of almost 250,000 Axis soldiers as prisoners of war (POWs). Throughout the fighting in North Africa, the division served under the command of the British Eighth Army, under General Bernard Montgomery.

Later, the 51st Division had a rest to absorb replacements for the heavy losses, in both manpower and materiel, suffered in North Africa and began training in amphibious warfare. In July, the division took part in the Allied invasion of Sicily, codenamed Operation Husky, suffering comparatively light casualties in the short campaign, which lasted for 38 days.

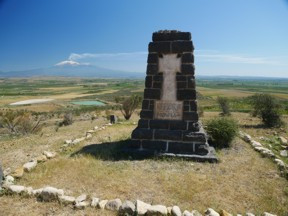
Memorial to the 51st Highland Division, Sferro, Sicily, Mount Etna in the background. Taken April 2018.

On the evening of 18 July 1943, members of the Division advanced towards Paterno in the foothills of Mount Etna. Their objective was the village and train station at Sferro and the bridge over the Simeto river. They met fierce resistance which continued throughout 19 July 1943. That night, the Gordon Highlanders, under heavy bombardment, crossed the railway and occupied Sferro village. During daylight hours of 20 July, the enemy maintained a steady bombardment. Action continued sporadically until August 3. The total casualties of the Division in the campaign had been 124 Officers and 1,312 other ranks. In November 1943, representatives of the 51st Highland Division erected a Memorial in the form of a stone Celtic Cross. The memorial still stands, overlooking Sferro and Mount Etna in the distance.

Towards the end of the campaign in early August, the division was withdrawn from combat and held in reserve for the Allied invasion of Italy. Although the 51st Division as a whole did not take part in the invasion, some of the division's artillery helped support Operation Baytown, the Eighth Army's crossing of the Strait of Messina in Sicily to the Italian "toe" at Reggio Calabria.

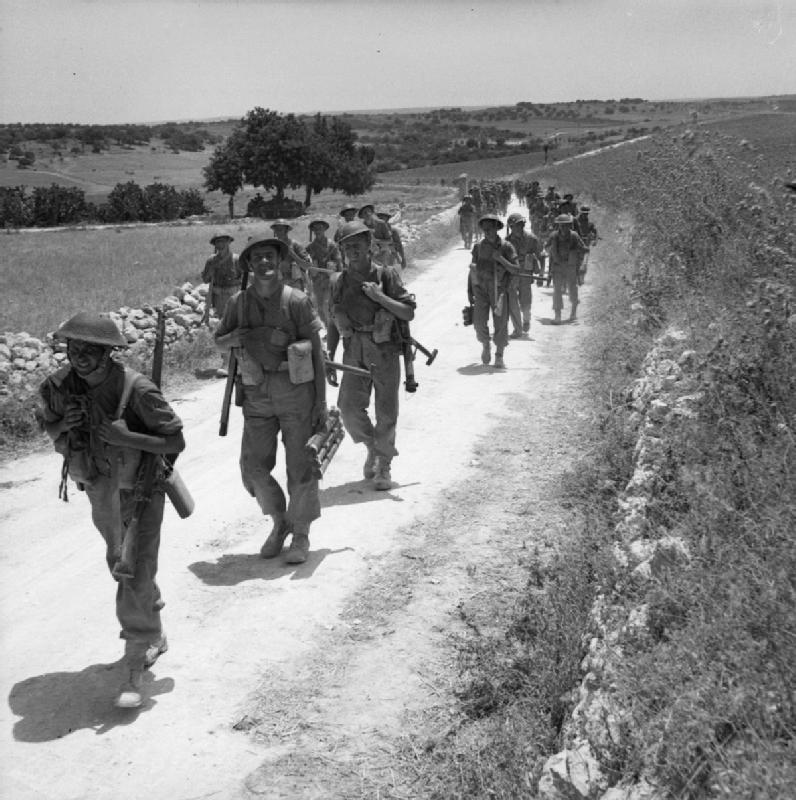
Men of the 2nd Battalion, Seaforth Highlanders advance along a road near Noto, Sicily, 11 July 1943.

The division was then recalled from the Eighth Army and returned to the United Kingdom, on the wishes of the Army's old commander, General Montgomery, together with the veteran 7th Armoured and 50th (Northumbrian) Infantry Divisions, to prepare for the opening of the Second Front in June 1944. Montgomery commented on the 51st "Of the many fine divisions that served under me in the Second World War, none were finer than the Highland Division" and later "It was the only infantry division in the armies of the British Empire that accompanied me during the whole of the long march from Alamein to Berlin."

When a group of recuperating wounded soldiers of the 51st returned from their North African hospital to rejoin the division in Sicily, they were instead split up and ordered to various units and formations, mainly the British 46th Infantry Division, which had suffered heavy casualties during the Salerno landings, totally unrelated to the 51st Division or its component regiments. Some soldiers of the division regarded this as administrative high-handedness and refused to follow these orders, and the result was the Salerno Mutiny. The mutineers were distributed to various units regardless, while ringleaders were sentenced to death (the sentences were later commuted and finally quashed).

=== Battle of Normandy ===
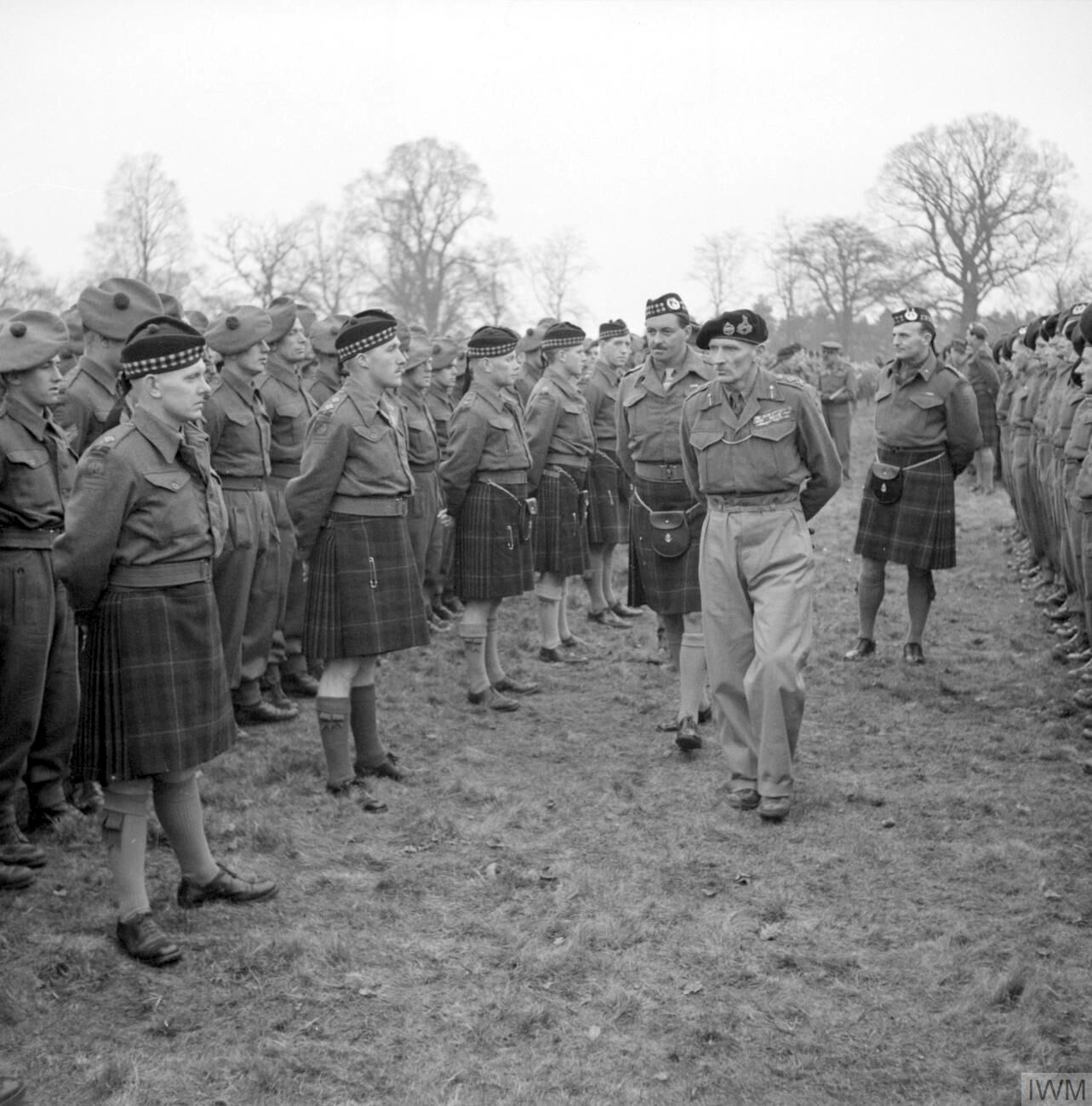
General Sir Bernard Montgomery, the newly appointed commander of the 21st Army Group, inspects officers and men of the 5/7th Battalion, Gordon Highlanders at Beaconsfield, Buckinghamshire, February 1944.

Most of the 51st landed in Normandy as part of Operation Overlord on 7 June 1944, a day after D-Day, as part of British I Corps, under Lieutenant-General John Crocker. After spending a brief period supporting the 3rd Canadian Infantry Division, it was sent across the River Orne, and spent two months supporting the 6th Airborne Division in its bridgehead. During this period it fought many difficult actions at places such as Bréville (11–12 June) and Colombelles (11 July).

The 51st (Highland) Infantry Division's performance in Normandy was, overall, considered disappointing, particularly by General Montgomery, now the Commander-in-Chief (C-in-C) of the Allied land forces in Normandy, who stated in a telegram to Field Marshal Sir Alan Brooke, the Chief of the Imperial General Staff (CIGS, the professional head of the British Army), that the division "had failed every mission it was given". This led to the replacement of its GOC, Major-General Charles Bullen-Smith; his dismissal is not mentioned in the Divisional Official History nor formation accounts. His successor was Major-General Tom Rennie, who had served with the division in France, North Africa and Sicily before being elevated to command of the British 3rd Infantry Division for the Normandy invasion, which he commanded until being wounded soon after D-Day, but had now recovered.

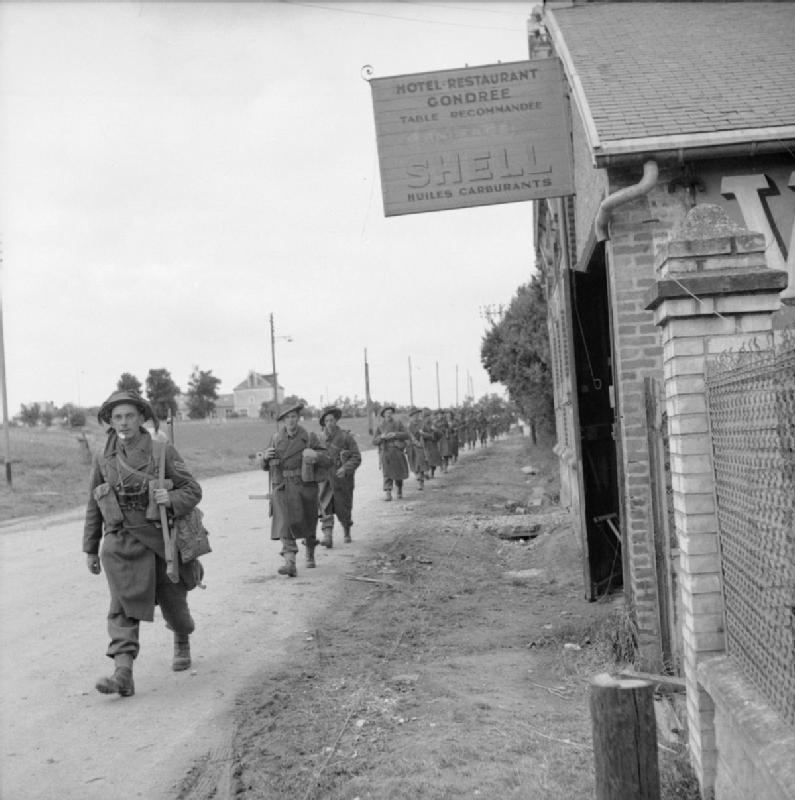
Men of either the 1st or 5/7th Battalion, Gordon Highlanders advance into Bénouville on the Caen canal soon after arrival in Normandy, France, 7 June 1944.

On 1 August 1944, the division, along with the rest of British I Corps, became part of the newly activated Canadian First Army. The division fought alongside this army in Operation Totalize, before advancing to Lisieux. It then continued east over the River Seine and headed, on General Montgomery's orders for Saint-Valery-en-Caux, the scene of the division's surrender in June 1940. The division's massed pipes and drums played in the streets of the town, and a parade included veterans of the 1940 campaign in France who were with the 51st Division in 1944.

A similar event occurred at Dieppe when it was liberated by the 2nd Canadian Infantry Division. Leaving Saint Valery, the 51st Division was engaged in Operation Astonia, the battle for the French port of Le Havre, in September 1944.

=== After Normandy ===
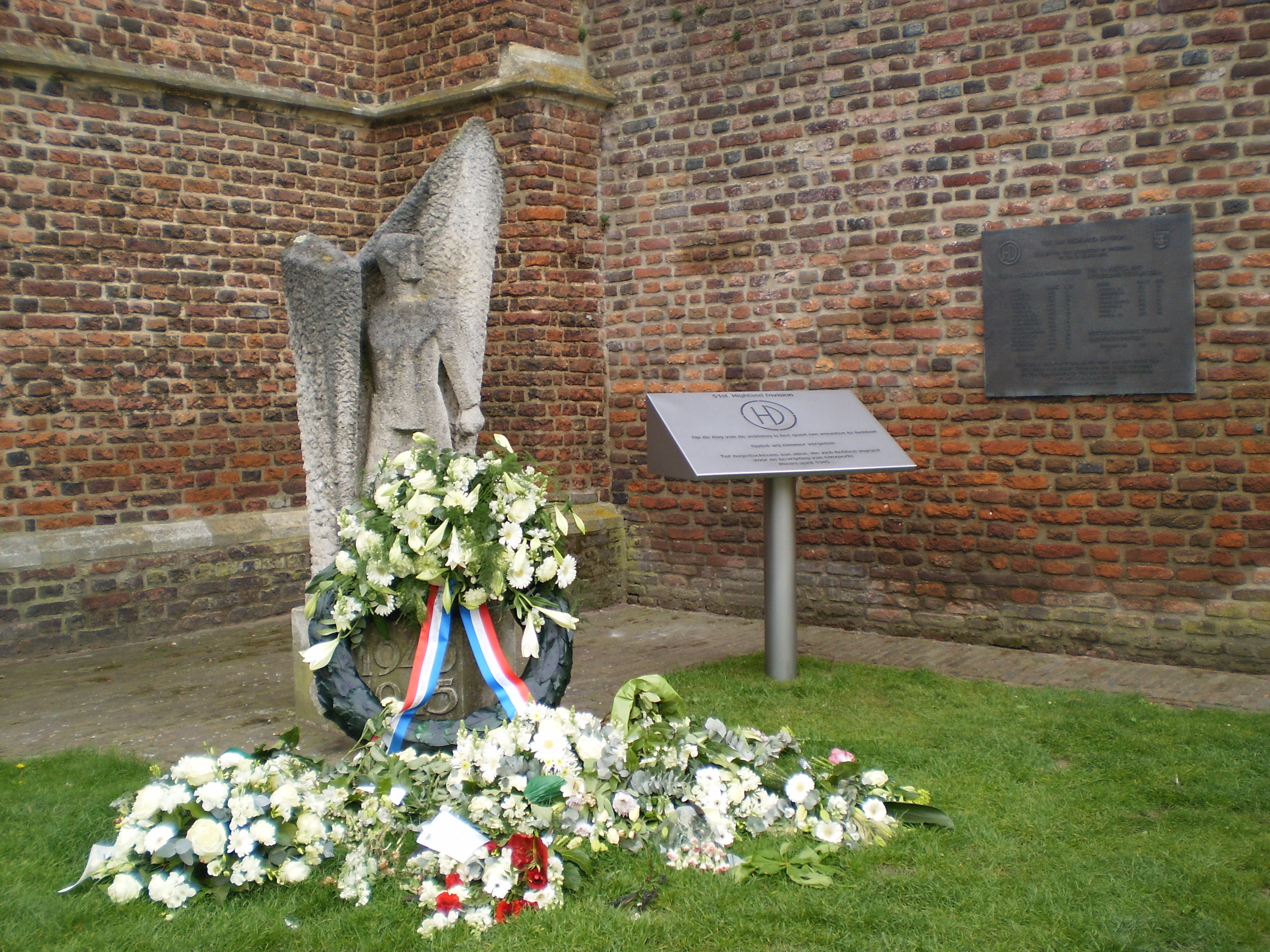
Memorials in Dutch village of Dinxperlo honouring the 51st (Highland) Infantry Division for liberating it

After the capture of the town of Le Havre, the division went on to take part in Operation Pheasant in October 1944, finally passing into reserve and garrisoning the Meuse River during the Battle of the Bulge, now as part of XXX Corps, under Lieutenant General Brian Horrocks. It was not involved in heavy fighting during the early stages of the battle and was deployed as a stopgap in case the Germans broke through.

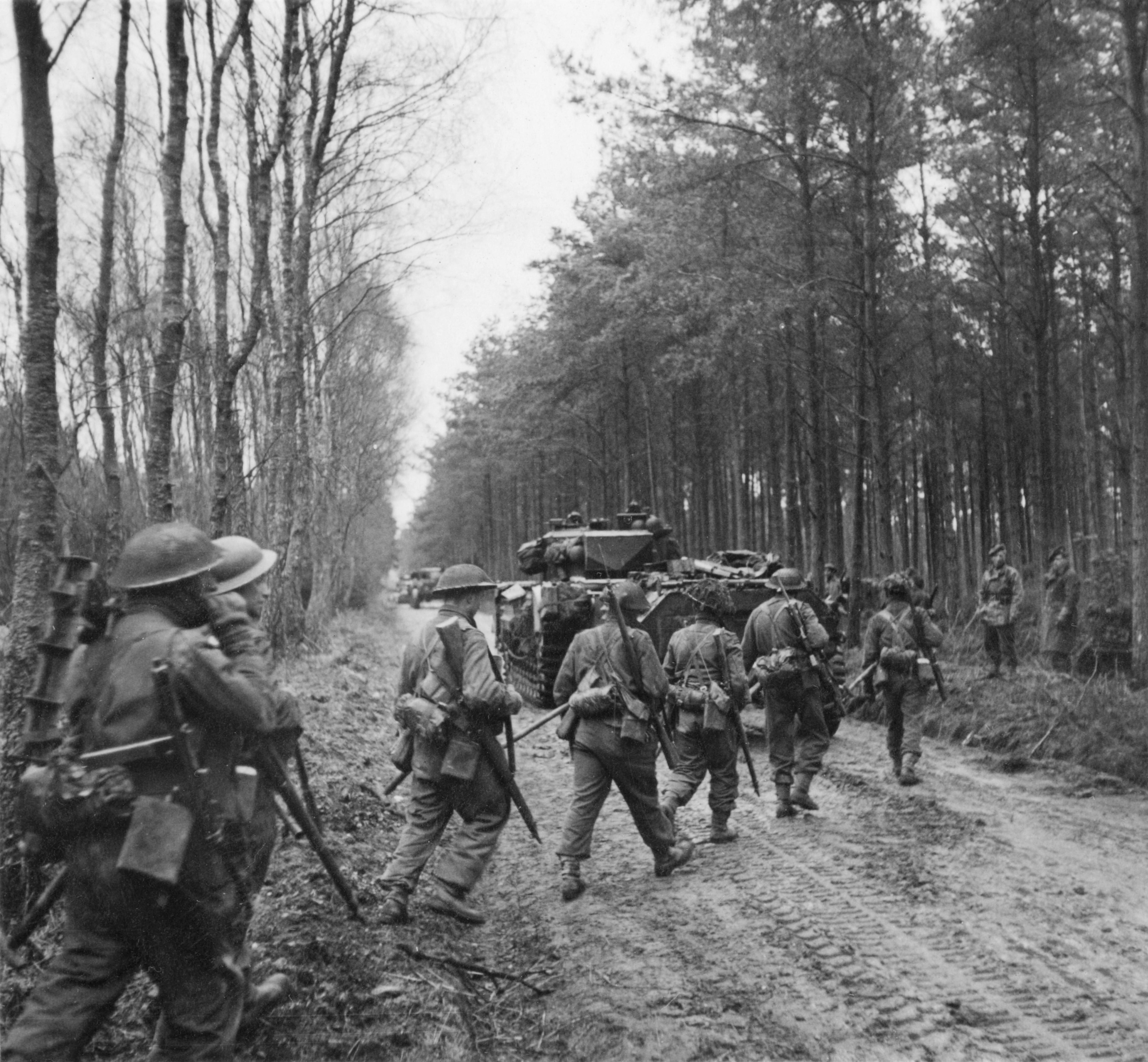
Men of the 2nd Battalion, Seaforth Highlanders and Churchill tanks in the Reichswald forest, Germany, 10 February 1945.

In January 1945, the division, along with the rest of XXX Corps, helped to cut off the northern tip of the German salient, linking up with the U.S. 84th Infantry Division at Nisramont on 14 January. Following this, the division was involved in Operation Veritable, the clearing of the Rhineland. In late March, the 51st took part in Operation Turnscrew within the framework of Operation Plunder, the crossing of the River Rhine, near the town of Rees, where the GOC, Major General Tom Rennie, was killed by enemy mortar fire. He was replaced by Major General Gordon MacMillan, a very highly experienced and competent commander who had previously been the GOC of the 49th (West Riding) Infantry Division.

The division advanced through Germany and ended the war in the Bremerhaven area of Northern Germany. During the North-West Europe campaign the 51st (Highland) Infantry Division had suffered a total of 19,524 battle casualties.

== Post War ==
A related formation, the 51st (Scottish) Division, was reformed in the Territorial Army after the Second World War. Beckett 2008 says that Territorial Army units that were in suspended animation were formally reactivated on 1 January 1947, though no personnel were assigned until commanding officers and permanent staff had been appointed in March and April 1947. By December 1947, the formation amalgamated with 52nd (Lowland) Infantry Division to become 51st/52nd Scottish Division, but, by March 1950, 51st Division and 52nd Division had been recreated as separate formations.

From December 1955, the division was placed on a lower establishment, for home defence purposes only. On 1 May 1961, the division was merged with Highland District to become 51st Highland Division/District. 51st (Highland) Division was disbanded in 1968.

== Legacy ==
A specific memorial to the 51st division created by the sculptor George Henry Paulin exists at the Beaumont-Hamel Newfoundland Memorial site on the Somme.

A further memorial in the form of a sculpture by Alan Herriot was unveiled in May 1995 on the North Inch in Perth, Scotland. As well as commemorating 50 years of peace in Europe, the sculpture depicts a Highlander being greeted by a young Dutch girl during the liberation of the Netherlands by the 51st.

The surrender of the 51st (Highland) Division at St Valery has become part of the mythology of Scottish nationalism, where it is often conflated with the Dunkirk evacuation and presented as a deliberate "sacrifice" of Scottish troops by Winston Churchill to allow "English" soldiers to be evacuated. In reality, the 51st Highlanders were attached to the French Tenth Army to defend the Weygand Line along the River Somme, some 123 miles south of Dunkirk. When the Germans broke through the Weygand Line, two days after the completion of the Dunkirk evacuation, the Division successfully withdrew in good order to Le Havre and St Valery. One-third of the division - Arkforce - was successfully evacuated from Le Havre in Operation Cycle, but the Royal Navy evacuation fleet was unable to sail to St Valery on the night of 11/12 June owing to fog.

=== Music ===
- "The 51st (Highland) Division's Farewell to Sicily", a folk song written by Hamish Henderson, a former officer who served in the 51st Division during the Sicilian campaign. It has been recorded by a number of folk singers, including Dick Gaughan.
- "The Beaches of St. Valery", performed by the Battlefield Band. Written by Davy Steele, it tells the story of the 51st Division's struggle to reach Saint-Valéry-en-Caux in 1940 only to find that no ships had been sent to evacuate them.
- "The Old Boys", performed by the Scottish group Runrig, who sing in both English and Gaelic. The song which first appeared on the album Recovery (1981) and was reprised on Protera (2003) speaks of the declining numbers of Gaelic speaking members of the 51st who fought at St Valery.
- "Farewell, 51st, farewell!", a folk song written by Andy Stewart, about scrapping of the 51st Division, but indicates that they will never be forgotten, as the lyrics say "On the glory road of fame, there is honour tae your name. Farewell 51st, Farewell."
- "The 51st Highland Division", a 4/4 march composed by Pipe Major Donald Mac leod.
- "The 51st Highland Division Farewell", a 2/4 march composed by Dr. Charles Bannatyne.
- "The 51st Highland Division at Wadi Akarit", a 2/4 march composed by W. Mac Donald.

=== Dance ===
- "The Reel of the 51st Division" was devised in the Laufen PoW camp by officers captured at St Valery. It was the very first modern Scottish country dance published by the Royal Scottish Country Dance Society. The original tune written in Laufen has been superseded by the traditional reel "The Drunken Piper" and the dance was re-cast from its original form involving a longwise set of ten men to the more usual four couple set. The original ten-man version is still danced in some parts.

=== In the media ===
On 15 July 2018, Channel 4 broadcast a documentary called 'Dunkirk: The Forgotten Heroes' In a review, in The Daily Telegraph, the programme was given four stars out of five and called "a terrific documentary that told the sad story of the men left behind".

== Victoria Cross recipients ==
=== First World War ===
- Sergeant William Gosling, Royal Field Artillery, 3rd Wessex Brigade
- Private George McIntosh, 1/6th Battalion, Gordon Highlanders
- Sergeant Alexander Edwards, 1/6th Battalion, Seaforth Highlanders
- Lance Corporal Robert McBeath, 1/5th Battalion, Seaforth Highlanders
- Sergeant John Meikle, 4th Battalion, Seaforth Highlanders
- Lieutenant William Davidson Bissett, 1/6th Battalion, Argyll and Sutherland Highlanders

=== Second World War ===
- Lieutenant Colonel Lorne MacLaine Campbell, 7th Battalion, Argyll and Sutherland Highlanders

== General officers commanding ==
The following officers commanded the division at various times:

Appointed	General officer commanding
April 1908	Major-General Forbes MacBean
March 1911	Major-General Charles L. Woollcombe
3 March 1914	Major-General Colin J. Mackenzie
23 August 1914	Brigadier-General Duncan Alwyn Macfarlane
27 August 1914	Major-General Richard Bannatine-Allason
24 September 1915	Major-General George M. Harper
11 March 1918	Brigadier-General Louis Oldfield
16 March 1918	Major-General George T. C. Carter-Campbell
June 1919	Major-General Ewen G. Sinclair-Maclagan
June 1923	Major-General Sir Archibald B. Ritchie
June 1927	Major-General Sir William M. Thomson
June 1931	Major-General Sir James L.G. Burnett
June 1935	Major-General W. Douglas S. Brownrigg
January 1938	Major-General Victor Fortune
August 1940	Major-General Sir Alan Cunningham
October 1940	Major-General Sir Neil M. Ritchie
June 1941	Major-General Douglas N. Wimberley
August 1943	Major-General D. Charles Bullen-Smith
July 1944	Major-General Thomas G. Rennie
March 1945	Major-General Gordon H. MacMillan
May 1945	Major-General A. James H. Cassels
11 January 1947	Major-General Colin M. Barber
May 1949	Major-General R. Keith Arbuthnott
November 1952	Major-General James Scott-Elliot
March 1956	Major-General Edward C. Colville
March 1959	Major-General Frederick C. C. Graham
March 1962	Major-General Derek B. Lang
April 1964	Major-General Ian A. Robertson
February 1966	Major-General Edward Maitland-Makgill-Crichton

== Order of battle ==
51st (Highland) Division

152nd (1st Highland) Brigade

- 1/5th (Sutherland and Caithness) Battalion, Seaforth Highlanders
- 1/6th (Morayshire) Battalion, Seaforth Highlanders
- 1/8th (Argyllshire) Battalion, Argyll and Sutherland Highlanders (from 154th Bde. April 1915)
- 1/4th Battalion, Queen's Own Cameron Highlanders (until February 1915)
- 1/6th (Renfrewshire) Battalion, Argyll and Sutherland Highlanders (from 154th Bde. April 1915 to June 1915)
- 1/6th (Banff and Donside) Battalion, Gordon Highlanders (from June 1916)

153rd (2nd Highland) Brigade

- 1/6th Battalion, Black Watch
- 1/7th (Fife) Battalion, Black Watch
- Shetland Companies, Gordon Highlanders
- 1/4th Battalion, Gordon Highlanders (until February 1915)
- 1/5th (Buchan and Formartine) Battalion, Gordon Highlanders (until February 1918)
- 1/7th (Deeside Highland) Battalion, Gordon Highlanders (until October 1918)

154th (3rd Highland) Brigade

The original brigade comprised the following battalions until April 1915 when some of the battalions moved to the 152nd Brigade:

- 1/6th (Renfrewshire) Battalion, Argyll and Sutherland Highlanders
- 1/7th Battalion, Argyll and Sutherland Highlanders
- 1/8th (Argyllshire) Battalion, Argyll and Sutherland Highlanders
- 1/9th (Dunbartonshire) Battalion, Argyll and Sutherland Highlanders

Between 18 April 1915 and January 1916, the brigade was replaced by the Territorial Force battalions of the 164th (North Lancashire) Brigade from the 55th (West Lancashire) Division.

- 1/4th Battalion, King's Own Royal Regiment (Lancaster)
- 1/8th (Liverpool Irish) Battalion, King's Regiment (Liverpool)
- 2/5th Battalion, Lancashire Fusiliers
- 1/4th Battalion, Loyal Regiment (North Lancashire)
- 1/6th Battalion, Cameronians (Scottish Rifles)

After early 1916, the brigade contained the following battalions:

- 1/4th (Ross Highland) Battalion, Seaforth Highlanders
- 1/4th Battalion, Gordon Highlanders
- 1/9th (Highlanders) Battalion, Royal Scots
- 1/7th Battalion, Argyll and Sutherland Highlanders

Artillery

- I Highland Brigade, Royal Field Artillery (numbered CCLV (I Highland) Brigade on 15 May 1916)
  - 1st Aberdeen Battery
  - 2nd Aberdeen Battery
  - 3rd Aberdeen Battery
  - I Highland Brigade Ammunition Column
- II Highland Brigade, RFA (numbered CCLVI (II Highland) Brigade on 19 May 1916)
  - Forfarshire Battery
  - Fifeshire Battery
  - Dundee Battery
  - II Highland Brigade Ammunition Column
- III Highland (Howitzer) Brigade, RFA (numbered CCLVIII (III Highland) Brigade on 17 May 1915; broken up 21 August 1916)
  - 1st Renfrew (Howitzer) Battery
  - 2nd Renfrew (Howitzer) Battery
  - III Highland (Howitzer) Brigade Ammunition Column
- Highland (Fifeshire) Heavy Battery, Royal Garrison Artillery (until 5 May 1915)
- I Lowland Brigade RFA (joined 10 November 1915 from Forth Defences; renumbered CCLVII on 15 May 1916, changed to CCLX on 3 June 1916; broken up 28 January 1917)
  - 1st Edinburgh Battery
  - 2nd Edinburgh Battery
  - Midlothian Battery
  - I Lowland Brigade Ammunition Column

After reorganisation in August 1916 and January 1917:

- CCLV Brigade, RFA
  - A, B, C, D (H) Batteries
- CCLVI Brigade, RFA
  - A, B, C, D (H) Batteries

Engineers

- 1st Highland Field Company, Royal Engineers (renumbered 400th (1st Highland) Field Company 3 February 1917)
- 2/2nd Highland Field Company, RE (raised after outbreak of war; renumbered 404th (2/2nd Highland) Field Company 3 February 1917)
- 3rd Durham Field Company, RE (joined 19 September 1915; transferred to 7th Division 30 January 1916)
- 2nd Highland Field Company, RE (transferred from 7th Division 31 January 1916; renumbered 401st (2nd Highland) Field Company 3 February 1917)

Pioneers

- 1/8th Battalion Royal Scots (transferred from 7th Division 19 August 1915)

51st (Highland) Infantry Division (1939–1940)

152nd Infantry Brigade (captured 12 June 1940)

- 4th Battalion, Seaforth Highlanders
- 6th Battalion, Seaforth Highlanders (left 3 March 1940)
- 4th Battalion, Queen's Own Cameron Highlanders
- 152nd Infantry Brigade Anti-Tank Company (formed 28 January 1940)
- 2nd Battalion, Seaforth Highlanders (from 30 March 1940)

153rd Infantry Brigade (captured 12 June 1940)

- 4th Battalion, Black Watch (Royal Highland Regiment)
- 5th Battalion, Gordon Highlanders
- 6th Battalion, Gordon Highlanders (left 7 March 1940)
- 153rd Infantry Brigade Anti-Tank Company (formed 18 November 1939)
- 1st Battalion, Gordon Highlanders (from 7 March 1940)
- 1st Battalion, Black Watch (Royal Highland Regiment) (from 5 June 1940)

154th Infantry Brigade (escaped 15 June 1940)

- 6th Battalion, Black Watch (Royal Highland Regiment) (left 4 March 1940)
- 7th Battalion, Argyll and Sutherland Highlanders
- 8th Battalion, Argyll and Sutherland Highlanders
- 154th Infantry Brigade Anti-Tank Company (formed 18 November 1939)
- 1st Battalion, Black Watch (Royal Highland Regiment) (from 4 March, left 5 June 1940)

Divisional Troops

- 1st Fife and Forfar Yeomanry (Reconnaissance regiment, left 29 March 1940)
- 1st Lothians and Border Horse (Divisional cavalry regiment from 29 March, captured 12 June 1940)
- 75th (Highland) Regiment, Royal Artillery (escaped with Arkforce 15 June 1940)
- 76th (Highland) Regiment, Royal Artillery (left 5 March 1940)
- 77th (Highland) Regiment, Royal Artillery (left 19 February 1940)
- 17th Field Regiment, Royal Artillery (from 19 February, escaped with Arkforce 15 June 1940)
- 23rd Field Regiment, Royal Artillery (from 5 March 1940, captured 12 June 1940)
- 51st (West Highland) Anti-Tank Regiment, Royal Artillery (captured 12 June 1940)
- 236th (City of Aberdeen) Field Company, Royal Engineers (captured 12 June 1940)
- 237th (City of Dundee) Field Company, Royal Engineers (captured 12 June 1940)
- 238th (County of Renfrewshire) Field Company, Royal Engineers (left 29 February 1940)
- 26th Field Company, Royal Engineers (from 28 February, captured 12 June 1940)
- 239th (City of Aberdeen) Field Park Company, Royal Engineers
- 51st (Highland) Division Postal Unit, Royal Engineers
- 51st (Highland) Divisional Signals Regiment, Royal Corps of Signals

Also attached were the following:

- 1st Battalion, Princess Louise's Kensington Regiment, Middlesex Regiment (Machine Gun Battalion)
- 7th Battalion, Royal Northumberland Fusiliers (Machine Gun Battalion)
- 7th Battalion, Royal Norfolk Regiment (Pioneers)
- 6th Battalion, Royal Scots Fusiliers (Pioneers)

51st (Highland) Infantry Division (1941–1945)

152nd Infantry Brigade (formerly 26th Infantry Brigade)

- 2nd Battalion, Seaforth Highlanders
- 4th/5th Battalion, Seaforth Highlanders (left 4 April 1941)
- 7th Battalion, Seaforth Highlanders (left 23 August 1940)
- 5th Battalion, Queen's Own Cameron Highlanders
- 152nd Infantry Brigade Anti-Tank Company (formed 1 September 1940, became A Squadron 51st Battalion, Reconnaissance Corps February 1941)
- 5th Battalion, Seaforth Highlanders (from 5 April 1941)

153rd Infantry Brigade (formerly 27th Infantry Brigade)

- 5th Battalion, Black Watch (Royal Highland Regiment)
- 7th Battalion, Gordon Highlanders (left 7 November 1939)
- 9th Battalion, Gordon Highlanders (left 2 September 1940)
- 1st Battalion, Gordon Highlanders
- 153rd Infantry Brigade Anti-Tank Company (formed 1 September 1940, became B Squadron 51st Battalion, Reconnaissance Corps February 1941)
- 5th/7th Battalion, Gordon Highlanders (from 21 October 1940)

154th Infantry Brigade (formerly 28th Infantry Brigade)

- 7th Battalion, Black Watch (Royal Highland Regiment) (left 21 August 1945)
- 7th/10th Battalion, Argyll and Sutherland Highlanders (became 7th Battalion 30 September 1942)
- 11th Battalion, Argyll and Sutherland Highlanders (left 22 September 1941)
- 2nd Battalion, Seaforth Highlanders (left 4 September 1940)
- 154th Infantry Brigade Anti-Tank Company (formed 1 September 1940, became C Squadron 51st Battalion, Reconnaissance Corps February 1941)
- 1st Battalion, Black Watch (Royal Highland Regiment) (from 24 October 1940)

Divisional Troops

- 51st Battalion, Reconnaissance Corps (formed from 14th Battalion, Highland Light Infantry, and brigade anti-tank companies January 1941, became 51st (Highland) Reconnaissance Regiment 6 June 1942, reverted to 14th HLI 14 January 1943)
- 2nd Derbyshire Yeomanry (joined as reconnaissance regiment, 20 January 1944)
- 1/7th Battalion, Middlesex Regiment (from 20 November 1941, joined as Machine Gun Battalion, became Support Battalion 10 December 1943, reverted to MG Battalion 28 February 1944)
- 126th (Highland) Field Regiment, Royal Artillery
- 127th (Highland) Field Regiment, Royal Artillery
- 128th (Highland) Field Regiment, Royal Artillery
- 61st (West Highland) Anti-Tank Regiment, Royal Artillery
- 40th Light Anti-Aircraft Regiment, Royal Artillery (from 1 May 1942)
- 274th Field Company, Royal Engineers
- 275th Field Company, Royal Engineers
- 276th Field Company, Royal Engineers
- 239th Field Park Company, Royal Engineers
- 16th Bridging Platoon, Royal Engineers (formed 19 December 1943)
- 51st (Highland) Division Postal Unit, Royal Engineers
- 51st (Highland) Divisional Signals Regiment, Royal Corps of Signals
- 13 Field Security Section, Intelligence Corps

== See also ==
- List of British divisions in World War I
- List of British divisions in World War II
- British Army Order of Battle (September 1939)

== Bibliography ==
- Becke, Maj A. F.,(2007) History of the Great War: Order of Battle of Divisions, Part 2a: The Territorial Force Mounted Divisions and the 1st-Line Territorial Force Divisions (42–56), London: HM Stationery Office, 1935/Uckfield: Naval & Military Press, ISBN 1-847347-39-8.
- Beckett, Ian F. W. (2008) 'Territorials: A Century of Service,' published by DRA Printing of 14 Mary Seacole Road, The Millfields, Plymouth PL1 3JY on behalf of TA 100, ISBN 978-0-9557813-1-5,
- Bewsher, F. W. (1921). The History of the 51st (Highland) Division 1914–1918. London: Blackwood. OCLC 3499483.
- Bond, Brian (2001). The Battle for France & Flanders: Sixty Years On. Pen and Sword. ISBN 978-0850528114.
- Campbell, Colin (2019). The 51st (Highland) Division in the Great War: Engine of Destruction. Pen and Sword Books. ISBN 978-1526747037.
- Delaforce, Patrick, (2007) Monty's Highlanders: The Story of the 51st Highland Division Pen & Sword, ISBN 1-84415-512-9
- Delaney, Douglas E. (2012). Corps Commanders: Five British and Canadian Generals at War, 1939-45. UBC Press. ISBN 978-0774820905.
- Doherty, Richard, (2006) None Bolder: The History of the 51st Highland Division in the Second World War Spellmount, ISBN 1-86227-317-0
- J.B.M. Frederick, Lineage Book of British Land Forces 1660–1978, Vol I, Wakefield: Microform Academic, 1984, ISBN 1-85117-007-3.
- Gorle, Richmond (2011) "The Quiet Gunner" Alamein to the Rhine with the Scottish Divisions, Pen and Sword ISBN 978-1-84884-540-4
- Lt-Col H.F. Joslen, Orders of Battle, United Kingdom and Colonial Formations and Units in the Second World War, 1939–1945, London: HM Stationery Office, 1960/London: London Stamp Exchange, 1990, ISBN 0-948130-03-2/Uckfield: Naval & Military Press, 2003, ISBN 1-843424-74-6.
- King, Anthony (2017) 'Why did 51st Highland Division Fail? A case-study in command and combat effectiveness', British Journal for Military History, Vol. 4, No.1.
- Linklater, Eric (1942) The Highland Division. HMSO, No ISBN.
- Mary, Jean-Yves; Hohnadel, Alain; Sicard, Jacques. (2003) Hommes et Ouvrages de la Ligne Maginot, Tome 3. Paris, Histoire & Collections, ISBN 2-913903-88-6 (in French)
- MacMillan, George; MacMillan, John; MacMillan, Judy; MacMillan, David; MacMillan, Andrew (2013). General Sir Gordon MacMillan of MacMillan and Knap, KCB KCVO CBE DSO MC LLD: The Babe, (1897–1986). FastPrint Publishing, Peterborough. ISBN 978-178035-577-1.
- Saunders, Nicholas; Cornish, Paul (2009). Contested Objects: Material Memories of the Great War. Routledge. ISBN 978-0415450706.
- Salmond, J. B. (1953) The Story of the 51st Highland Division. Wm Blackwood & Sons, No ISBN.
- Spiers, Edward M.; Crang, Jeremy; Strickland, Matthew; Crang, Jeremy A. (2012). A Military History of Scotland Hardcover. Edinburgh University Press. ISBN 978-0748633357.
- Swaab, Jack (2005) "Field of Fire: Diary of a Gunner Officer". Sutton Publishing, ISBN 0-7509-4275-4
- Westlake, Ray (1992). British Territorial Units 1914–18. Men-at-Arms Series. Vol. 245. Osprey. ISBN 978-1-85532-168-7.

=== External links ===
- The Official Website of the 51 Highland Division
- The British Army in the Great War: The Long, Long Trail Archived 15 October 2015 at the Wayback Machine
- The Forgotten 51st
- The Forgotten Heroes of World War 2 by Robert Beesley
- Remember the 51st (Highland) Division at Saint-Valéry-en-Caux
- Orbat.com
- Timeline history of 1940 surrender with photos of the memorial at Veules-les-Roses
