= Derek Lang =

British Army general (1913–2001)

Lieutenant-General Sir Derek Lang KCB DSO MC
- Born: 7 October 1913; Guildford, Surrey, England
- Died: 7 April 2001 (aged 87); Kirknewton, West Lothian, Scotland
- Military career
- Allegiance: United Kingdom
- Branch: British Army
- Service years: 1933–1969
- Rank: Lieutenant-General
- Service number: 56733
- Unit: Queen's Own Cameron Highlanders
- Commands: 5th Battalion, Queen's Own Cameron Highlanders; 153rd (Highland) Infantry Brigade; 51st (Highland) Division; Scottish Command
- Conflicts: Arab revolt in Palestine; Second World War
- Awards: Knight Commander of the Order of the Bath; Distinguished Service Order; Military Cross; Mentioned in despatches (3)

Lieutenant-General Sir Derek Boileau Lang KCB DSO MC (7 October 1913 − 7 April 2001) was a senior British Army officer who served in the Second World War and was later General officer commanding-in-Chief (GOC-in-C) of Scottish Command.

== Military career ==
Derek Lang was born in Guildford, Surrey, England, on 7 October 1913, the son of Derek Lang. He was educated at Wellington College, Berkshire and the Royal Military College, Sandhurst. From there he was commissioned as a second lieutenant into the Queen's Own Cameron Highlanders on 31 August 1933. He served initially with the regiment's 1st Battalion before, promoted on 31 August 1936 to lieutenant, he served with the 2nd Battalion, Cameron Highlanders in Palestine during the Arab revolt. In February 1938 he was sent to Scotland where he became adjutant to the regiment's 4th Battalion, a Territorial Army unit serving as part of the 51st (Highland) Division, then commanded by Major General Victor Fortune.

Still adjutant upon the outbreak of the Second World War in September 1939, Lang was sent to France, along with the rest of the 51st Division, in January 1940, where it formed part of the British Expeditionary Force (BEF). However, Lang became a prisoner of war in June after the German Army invaded France. The 51st Division had been separated from the rest of the BEF earlier in the year, and, after hard fighting, retreated to Saint-Valery-en-Caux, where most of the division surrendered on 12 June 1940, Lang being among 10,000 to surrender that day.

After escaping and making his way to Palestine (for which he was awarded the Military Cross), he served with the 2nd Battalion, Cameron Highlanders, and served with the battalion until August 1941. He returned to the United Kingdom and, eventually, went on to be Commanding officer (CO) of the 5th Battalion, Queen's Own Cameron Highlanders from July 1944. The battalion was a TA unit formed in 1939 as a second line duplicate of the 4th Battalion and now formed part of the 152nd Brigade, commanded by Brigadier James Cassels, of Major General Tom Rennie's 51st (Highland) Division. Both the original brigade and division had been captured, as had Lang himself, in France in June 1940 but had been reformed that August by redesignating the 9th (Highland) Infantry Division and, after having served in North Africa and Sicily, were now fighting in Normandy in the aftermath of the D-Day landings. Lang was to command the 5th Cameron Highlanders throughout the rest of the campaign in Northwest Europe until Victory in Europe Day (VE Day) in May 1945. He was awarded the Distinguished Service Order for his leadership of the battalion in 1944.

In 1958 he became commanding officer of the 153rd Highland Brigade. He was made Chief of Staff at Scottish Command in 1960, then General Officer Commanding 51st (Highland) Division in March 1962 before moving on to a posting as Director of Army Training in 1964. He was appointed General Officer Commanding-in-Chief at Scottish Command and Governor of Edinburgh Castle in 1966 and was appointed a Knight Commander of the Order of the Bath (KCB) in the 1967 Birthday Honours. He retired from the British Army in 1969. After retiring from the Army he was Secretary of Stirling University from 1970 to 1973.

== Family ==
In 1942 he married Massy Dawson and together they went on to have one son and two daughters before she died in 1953; in 1953 he married A.L.S. Shields but the marriage was dissolved in 1969; then in 1969 he married E.H. Balfour who died in 1982 and in 1983 he married Maartje McQueen.

He died at Kirknewton in Midlothian on 7 April 2001.

Military offices
Preceded by Frederick Graham	GOC 51st (Highland) Division; 1962–1964	Succeeded by Ian Robertson
Preceded by Sir George Gordon-Lennox	GOC-in-C Scottish Command; 1966–1969	Succeeded by Sir Henry Leask
