= Alister Fraser Gordon =

Brigadier-General Alister Fraser Gordon CMG DSO
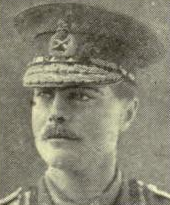
- Born: 1 February 1872
- Died: 31 July 1917 (aged 45); Near Langemark, Belgium
- Burial place: Lijssenthoek Military Cemetery
- Military career
- Allegiance: United Kingdom
- Branch: British Army
- Service years: 1890–1917
- Rank: Brigadier-General
- Unit: Gordon Highlanders
- Commands: 153rd Infantry Brigade; 182nd Infantry Brigade; 2nd Battalion British Central African Rifles
- Conflicts: Chitral Expedition; War of the Golden Stool; Second Boer War; First World War
- Awards: Companion of the Order of St Michael and St George; Distinguished Service Order; Mentioned in Despatches (9)

Brigadier-General Alister Fraser Gordon, CMG, DSO (1 February 1872 – 31 July 1917) was a British Army officer. He was killed during the First World War whilst commanding the 153rd Infantry Brigade, shortly before the beginning of the Third Battle of Ypres.

== Military career ==
The third son of W. G. Gordon, of Drumdewan, Inverness, Alister Gordon was educated at The School, Inverness, and the Royal Military College, Sandhurst. He was gazetted to the Royal Highlanders as a second lieutenant in October 1890, before exchanging to the Gordon Highlanders the following month. He became a first lieutenant in 1893 and a captain in 1899.

Gordon saw service with the Chitral Relief Force in 1895 and with the Tirah Expeditionary Force from 1897 to 1898, for which he was twice mentioned in despatches. In 1899, he was seconded to the British Central African Rifles, eventually commanding the 2nd Battalion (with local rank of captain/major), and took part in the Anglo-Ashanti War of 1900. For his services, he was mentioned in despatches and appointed a Companion of the Distinguished Service Order.

From 1901 to 1902, Gordon took part in the Second Boer War as Station Staff Officer and Railway Staff Officer. He was regimental adjutant from 1903 until 1906. He later passed the Staff College. From 1908 to 1912, he was a General Staff Officer (GSO) Grade 3 and promoted to major. In 1913, he was appointed a deputy assistant adjutant and quartermaster general in the Territorial Force.

At the outbreak of the First World War, Gordon was appointed Deputy Assistant Adjutant and Quartermaster-General, then Assistant Adjutant and Quartermaster-General with the temporary rank of lieutenant-colonel, his rank being made permanent in December 1914. Gordon was wounded at the Battle of Festubert in May 1915 and sent home. He was appointed a Companion of the Order of St Michael and St George in June 1915. In December, he was appointed temporary GSO2 at the War Office.

In February 1916, Gordon was made a temporary brigadier-general and given command of the 182nd Infantry Brigade, which he led during the Battle of Fromelles in July 1916. He was injured in August 1916 and relinquished command. On 1 January 1917, he was made a brevet colonel for "distinguished service in the field". He then held an appointment as a deputy director in the War Office.

Gordon took command of the 153rd Infantry Brigade in May 1917. On 29 July 1917, two days before the beginning of the Third Battle of Ypres, Gordon was visiting the trenches when he was hit by a German shell. He died two days later. He is buried at Lijssenthoek Military Cemetery.

By the King's special order, a printed copy of his six mentions in despatches from the First World War was sent to his widow by the War Office along with a message from His Majesty.

== See also ==
- List of generals of the British Empire who died during the First World War

== Bibliography ==
- Davis, Frank; Maddocks, Graham (1995). Bloody Red Tabs – General Officer Casualties of the Great War, 1914–1918. London: Leo Cooper.
