= 153rd Infantry Brigade (United Kingdom) =

Aberdeen Brigade Gordon Brigade 2nd Highland Brigade 153rd Infantry Brigade
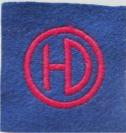
- 51st (Highland) Division's insignia from 1940 onwards
- Active: 1890–1919; 1920–1940; 1940–1946; 1947–1967
- Country: United Kingdom
- Branch: Territorial Army
- Type: Infantry
- Size: Brigade
- Part of: 51st (Highland) Division
- Garrison/HQ: Aberdeen
- Engagements: World War I: Battle of Festubert; Battle of the Somme; Battle of Arras; Third Battle of Ypres; Battle of Cambrai; German spring offensive; Hundred Days Offensive; World War II; Battle of France; Battle of El Alamein; Tunisian campaign; Sicilian campaign; Normandy campaign; Reichswald; Rhine crossing

Commanders
- Notable commanders: Douglas Graham; Sir Horatius Murray; Roderick Sinclair, 19th Earl of Caithness

153rd Infantry Brigade was a formation of Britain's Territorial Force/Territorial Army that was part of 51st (Highland) Division in both World Wars. From its origins in the 19th Century Volunteer Force it was based in Aberdeen and was composed of Highland battalions. It served on the Western Front in World War I, and after it was captured at Saint-Valery-en-Caux early in World War II it was reformed from its 2nd Line and saw action in North Africa, Sicily and North West Europe. It continued serving postwar until the reduction of the Territorial Army in the 1960s.

== Volunteer Force ==
The Volunteer Force of part-time military units formed in Great Britain after an invasion scare in 1859 had no higher organisation than the battalion until the Stanhope Memorandum of December 1888 proposed a comprehensive mobilisation scheme. Under this scheme Volunteer infantry battalions would assemble in their own brigades at key points in case of war. In peacetime these brigades provided a structure for collective training. Five Volunteer Infantry Brigades were initially formed in Scotland, covering the Highlands, the South of Scotland, and the Clyde, Forth and Tay estuaries. The Volunteer Battalions (VBs) of the Gordon Highlanders, recruiting from Aberdeenshire and Banffshire, were initially assigned to the Tay Brigade (1st, 2nd and 4th VBs) and the Highland Brigade (3rd, 5th and 6th VBs). However, the original Volunteer brigades were too large and cumbersome, and in 1890 the 1st, 2nd, 3rd, 4th and 5th VBs of the Gordons were separated to form the Aberdeen Brigade (Headquarters (HQ) at 60 School Hill, Aberdeen), with only the 6th VB remaining in the Highland Brigade. Until 1892 the command of the Aberdeen Brigade was exercised by the officer commanding 75th Regimental District, then Major-General F.S. Russell of Aden was appointed to the command, which he held until 1902. In the reorganisation at the end of the Second Boer War in 1902, the Aberdeen Brigade was renamed the Gordon Brigade, now consisting of all seven VBs of the regiment (an additional battalion having been raised in Shetland in 1900) under the officer commanding the regimental district:

- 1st Volunteer Battalion at Aberdeen
- 2nd Volunteer Battalion at Old Meldrum
- 3rd (The Buchan) Volunteer Battalion at Peterhead
- 4th (Donside Highland) Volunteer Battalion at 28 Guild Street, Aberdeen
- 5th (Deeside Highland) Volunteer Battalion at Banchory
- 6th Volunteer Battalion at Keith
- 7th Volunteer Battalion at Lerwick (three companies attached to 1st VB)
- Gordon Bearer Company, Army Medical Corps
- Army Service Corps Company

For the Royal Review at Edinburgh on 17 September 1905, the 7th (London Scottish) Middlesex Rifle Volunteer Corps and the officers of the 8th (Scottish) Volunteer Battalion, King's (Liverpool Regiment), were attached to the Gordon Brigade under the command of Brigadier-General P.D. Trotter, which was part of the '3rd Infantry Division' formed for the day. In 1906 permanent commanders were appointed to the Volunteer Brigades, drawn from retired colonels, Col J.W. Hughes-Hallett being appointed to the Gordon Brigade.

== Territorial Force ==
In 1908 the Volunteers were subsumed into the new Territorial Force (TF) and the Gordon Brigade became the second brigade in the TF's new Highland Division. The battalions had been reorganised as follows:

- HQ at the Territorial Barracks, Fonthill Road, Aberdeen
- 4th Battalion at Custom House, Guild Street, Aberdeen
- 5th (Buchan and Formartine) Battalion at Peterhead
- 6th (Banff and Donside) Battalion at Bridge Street, Banff
- 7th (Deeside Highland) Battalion at Banchory (Shetland Companies attached)

== World War I ==
=== Mobilisation ===
The Highland Division was at its annual camp in 1914 when it received orders to mobilise at 17.35 on 4 August and by 17 August had concentrated at its war stations round Bedford as part of First Army in Central Force. Although the TF was intended as a home defence force and its members could not be compelled to serve outside the UK, units were invited to volunteer for overseas service and the majority did so. Those who did not volunteer were formed into 2nd Line units and formations to train the mass of volunteers who were coming forward; these were given the prefix '2/' to distinguish them from the 1st Line. (192nd (2nd Gordon Highlanders) Brigade formed in 64th (2nd Highland) Division as a 2nd Line duplicate; this never saw action, but supplied drafts to the 1st Line.) Individual TF battalions began being sent to the Western Front to reinforce the British Expeditionary Force (BEF): the 1/6th Gordons left on 5 December, and the 1/4th Gordons on 27 February 1915. (Although both battalions eventually returned to the Highland Division, they were assigned to different brigades.) In April the whole of the Highland Division prepared to join the BEF, and two battalions were transferred to the Gordons Brigade from the independent Black Watch Brigade. From now on the Gordons Brigade, as the second brigade in the division, was designated 2nd Highland Brigade. The division completed its concentration on the Western Front on 6 May, and on 12 May it was designated 51st (Highland) Division, the brigade becoming 153rd (2nd Highland) Brigade.

=== Order of Battle ===
For the rest of the war, 153rd (2nd Highland) Brigade had the following composition:

- 1/6th (Perthshire) Battalion, Black Watch
- 1/7th (Fife) Battalion, Black Watch
- 1/5th (Buchan and Formartine) Battalion, Gordon Highlanders – transferred to 61st (2nd South Midland) Division 2 February 1918
- 1/7th (Deeside Highland) Battalion, Gordon Highlanders – transferred to 152nd (1st Highland) Brigade and amalgamated with 1/7th Gordons, 6 October 1918
- 153rd Brigade Machine Gun Company – formed 12 January 1916; transferred to No 51 Battalion, Machine Gun Corps 10 February 1918
- 417 Trench Mortar Battery – joined 2 March, became 153/1 TM Bty 15 March 1916
- 153/2 Trench Mortar Battery – joined by May 1916
- 153rd Brigade Trench Mortar Battery – formed by July 1916 from 153/1 and 153/2 TM Btys
- 1/7th Battalion, Argyll and Sutherland Highlanders – joined from 5th Division 6 October 1918

=== Service ===
153rd (2nd Highland) Brigade was engaged in the following actions:

1915

- Battle of Festubert, 19–25 May
- Second Action of Givenchy, 15–16 June

1916

- Battle of the Somme:
  - Attacks on High Wood, 21–30 July
  - Battle of the Ancre, 13–18 November
  - Capture of Beaumont-Hamel, 13 November

1917

- Battle of Arras:
  - First Battle of the Scarpe, 9–11 April
  - Second Battle of the Scarpe, 23–24 April
  - Capture and Defence of Rœux, 13–16 May
- Third Battle of Ypres:
  - Battle of Pilckem Ridge, 31 July–2 August
  - Battle of the Menin Road Ridge, 20–24 September
- Battle of Cambrai:
  - The Tank Attack, 10–21 November
  - Capture of Bourlon Wood, 23 November
  - German Counter-Attacks, 1–3 December

1918

- German spring offensive:
  - Battle of St Quentin,21–23 March
  - First Battle of Bapaume, 24–25 March
- Battle of the Lys:
  - Battle of Estaires (9–11 April)
  - Battle of Hazebrouck (12–15 April)

51st (H) Division's casualties during the Battle of the Lys were so great that on 12 April it was reduced to a composite brigade under the Commander, Royal Engineers, ('Fleming's Force') and each brigade was reduced to battalion strength. 153rd Brigade Composite Battalion (200 men) was commanded by Major W.H. Newson under Lieutenant-Colonel J.M. Scott, commanding 152nd and 153rd Brigades. The division was withdrawn after the battle and underwent a long period of rest and reinforcement in a quiet sector.

- Battle of Tardenois 20 –31 July
- Hundred Days Offensive:
  - Battle of the Scarpe, 26–30 August
  - Pursuit to the Selle, 11–12 October
  - Battle of the Selle, 17–25 October

After the Armistice with Germany in November 1918 51st (H) Division was billeted in the Scheldt Valley where demobilisation got under way. 1/6th Black Watch left the brigade and was posted to the Highland Division in the British Army of the Rhine. By the middle of March 1919 the remaining units had been reduced to cadre strength and left for home.

=== Commanders ===
The following officers commanded 153rd (2nd Highland) Brigade during the war:

- Colonel George Stockwell, 22 January 1912 (Brig-Gen from mobilisation)
- Brig-Gen D. Campbell, 1 February 1915
- Brig-Gen Alister Fraser Gordon, 6 May 1917, died of wounds 31 July 1917
- Lt-Col H.G. Hyslop, acting 29 July 1917
- Brig-Gen A.T. Beckwith, 2 August 1917, wounded 11 April 1918
- Lt-Col L.M. Dyson, acting 11 April 1918
- Maj W.H. Newson, commanding 153rd Brigade Composite Bn 13 April 1918
- Lt-Col J.M. Scott, commanding 152nd and 153rd Brigades 13 April 1918
- Brig-Gen William Green, 15 April 1918

== Interwar ==
The TF was reconstituted on 7 February 1920 and was reorganised as the Territorial Army (TA) the following year, with some units having merged. The brigade was reformed as 153rd (Black Watch and Gordon) Brigade:

- HQ at Drill Hall, 43 Skene Terrace, Aberdeen
- 4th/5th (Dundee and Angus) Bn, Black Watch, at Drill Hall, West Bell Street, Dundee
- 6th/7th (Perth and Fife) Bn, Black Watch, at Tay Street, Perth
- 4th (The City of Aberdeen) Bn, Gordon Highlanders, at Drill Hall, Woolmanhill, Aberdeen
- 5th/7th (Buchan, Mar and Mearns) Bn, Gordon Highlanders, at Drill Hall, Bucksburn

== World War II ==
=== Mobilisation ===
In the months before the outbreak of war the TA was doubled in size, with most units and formations creating duplicates. 27 Infantry Brigade was formed in 9th (Highland) Infantry Division formed the 2nd Line for 153 Brigade, with some of its battalions formed by reversing the mergers of the 1920s. After the TA was mobilised on 1 September 1939 153 Brigade had the following composition:

- 4th Bn, Black Watch – left for 154 Brigade 5 June 1940
- 5th (Buchan and Formartine) Bn, Gordon Highlanders
- 6th (Banffshire) Bn, Gordon Highlanders – left for 1st Division 7 March 1940
- 153rd Infantry Brigade Anti-Tank Company – formed 18 November 1939
- 1st Bn, Gordon Highlanders – joined from 1st Division 7 March 1940
- 1st Bn, Black Watch – joined from 154 Brigade 5 June 1940

=== Battle of France ===
The 51st (H) Division joined the British Expeditionary Force (BEF) in France, 153 Bde landing on 30 January 1940. However, when the Phoney War ended with the German invasion of the Low Countries on 10 May, 51st (H) Division was detached and serving under French command on the Saar front. Cut off from the rest of the BEF, which was evacuated from Dunkirk, it retreated to the coast where most of the division was forced to surrender at Saint-Valery-en-Caux on 12 June.

The decision was made to reconstitute the famous 51st (Highland) Division by redesignating its duplicate formation, the 9th (Highland) Division in Scottish Command, on 7 August. At the same time 153 Brigade was recreated by redesignating 27 Brigade.

=== Reconstituted Brigade ===
The brigade was reconstituted as follows:

- 5th Bn, Black Watch
- 9th Bn, Gordon Highlanders – left 2 September 1940
- 1st Bn, Gordon Highlanders – reformed 3 August 1940
- 153rd Infantry Brigade Anti-Tank Company – reformed 1 September 1940, left 14 December 1940 and became B Company, 51st (Highland) Reconnaissance Battalion, 8 January 1941
- 5th/7th Bn Gordon Highlanders – joined 2 October 1940

=== Service ===
51st (H) Division sailed for Egypt on 16 June 1942 and 153 Bde was engaged in the following actions under its command during the war:

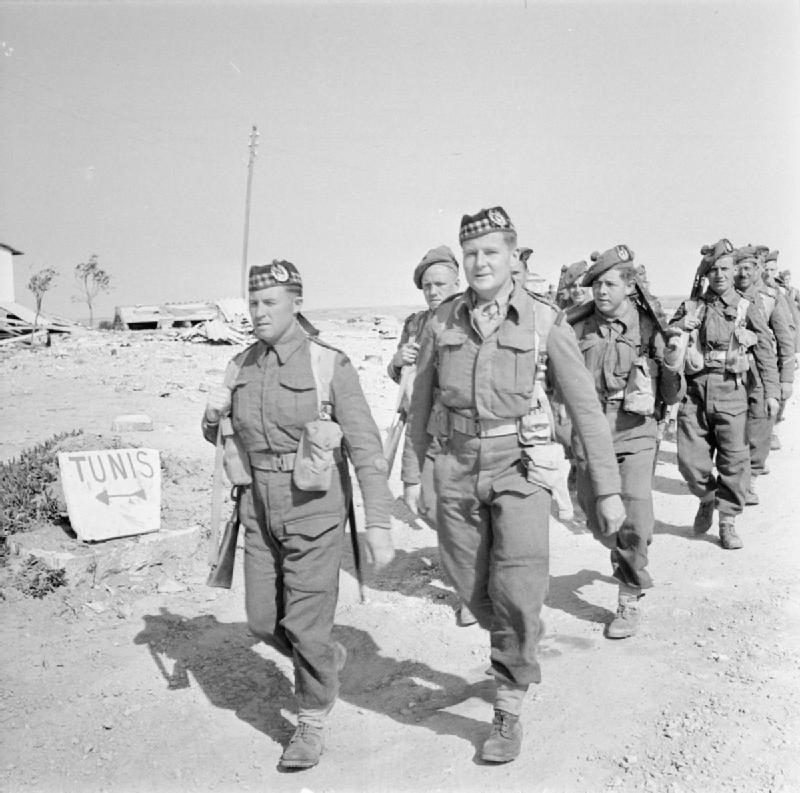
Men of the Gordon Highlanders cross the border into Tunisia, 1943.

1942

- Western Desert campaign:
  - Second Battle of El Alamein, 23 October–4 November

1943

- Tunisian campaign:
  - Battle of Medenine, 6 March
  - Battle of the Mareth Line, 16–31 March
  - Battle of Wadi Akarit, 6–7 April
  - Enfidaville (Operation Vulcan) 19–29 April
  - Tunis (Operation Strike), 5–12 May
- Sicilian campaign:
  - Landings (Operation Husky) 9–12 July
  - Adrano (Battle of Centuripe), 29 July–3 August

1944

- Normandy campaign:
  - Operation Goodwood, 18–23 July
  - Battle of Falaise, 7–22 August
  - Le Havre (Operation Astonia), 10–12 September

1945

- Reichswald (Operation Veritable), 8 February–10 March
- Rhine Crossing (Operation Plunder), 23 March –1 April

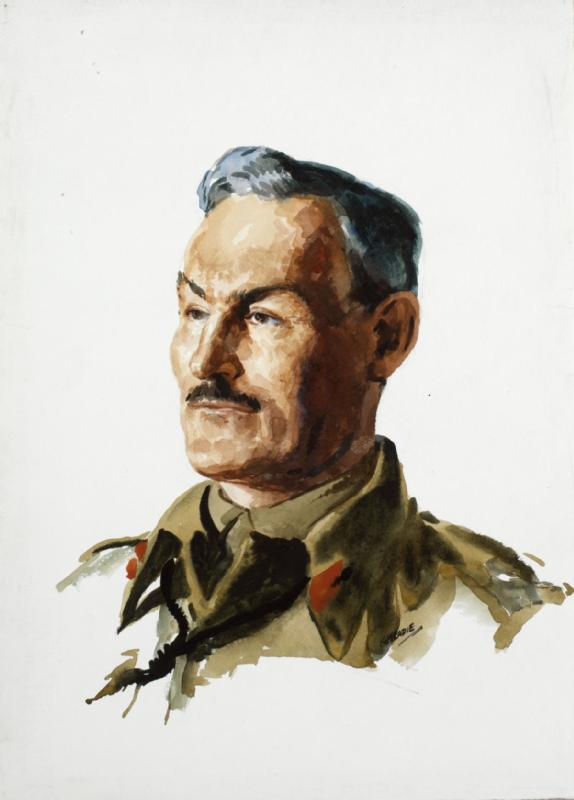
Brigadier Douglas Graham later commander of 51st (H) Division.

=== Commanders ===
The following officers commanded 153 Bde after its reconstitution:

- Brigadier Douglas Graham, 5 April 1940
- Lt-Col Lorne MacLaine Campbell, acting 25 April 1943
- Lt-Col W.N. Roper-Caldbeck, acting 15 May 1943
- Brig Horatius Murray, 24 May 1943
- Lt-Col Hon Harry Hovell-Thurlow-Cumming-Bruce, acting 12 August 1944
- Brig Roderick Sinclair, 19 August 1944

== Postwar ==
The TA was reformed on 1 January 1947, with 153 (Highland) Brigade in 51st/52nd Scottish Division until the two divisions regained their independence in 1950. The TA's divisional/brigade structure disappeared with the reduction into the Territorial and Army Volunteer Reserve in 1967. The brigade's composition in 1947 was:

- 11 Bn, Seaforth Highlanders, at Golspie
- 4/5 Bn, Queen's Own Cameron Highlanders, at Inverness
- 4/7 Bn, Gordon Highlanders, at Aberdeen
- 5/6 (Banff, Buchan and Donside) Bn, Gordon Highlanders, at Bucksburn

(The Lovat Scouts at Beauly may also have been included, but that regiment was in the process of reforming in the Royal Armoured Corps.)
