= Ian Robertson (British Army officer) =

British Army officer

Major-General Ian Robertson CB MBE
- Born: 17 July 1913; Richmond, London
- Died: 10 January 2010 (aged 96)
- Military career
- Allegiance: United Kingdom
- Branch: British Army
- Rank: Major-General
- Commands: 2nd Bn, Seaforth Highlanders; 1st Bn, Seaforth Highlanders; 127 (East Lancashire) Infantry Brigade; School of Infantry; 51st (Highland) Division
- Conflicts: Second World War; Aden Emergency
- Awards: Companion of the Order of the Bath; Member of the Order of the British Empire

Major-General Ian Argyll Robertson of Brackla, CB, MBE (17 July 1913 – 10 January 2010) was a senior British Army officer.

== Military career ==
Educated at Winchester College and Trinity College, Oxford, Robertson was commissioned into the Seaforth Highlanders on 13 July 1934. He served, on a temporary basis, as commanding officer of the 2nd Battalion, the Seaforth Highlanders during the Italian campaign of the Second World War and then took part in the Normandy landings in June 1944 and subsequent campaign in North West Europe.

After the war he became commanding officer of the 1st Battalion, the Seaforth Highlanders in 1954 and saw action during the Aden Emergency. He went on to be commander of 127 (East Lancashire) Infantry Brigade in August 1959, commandant of the School of Infantry at Warminster in August 1963 and General Officer Commanding 51st (Highland) Division in April 1964. After that he became Director of Equipment Policy at the Ministry of Defence in March 1966 before retiring in 1968.

He lived at Brackla, not far from Cawdor, and was granted the lairdly title "of Brackla" by the Court of the Lord Lyon on recording arms in 1961.

In retirement he was Vice-Lord Lieutenant of the Highland Region from 1980 until 1988.

== Family ==
In 1939, he married Marjorie Duncan; they had two daughters.

Military offices
Preceded by Derek Lang	GOC 51st (Highland) Division; 1964–1966	Succeeded by Edward Maitland-Makgill-Crichton
