= 152nd Infantry Brigade (United Kingdom) =

Highland Brigade Seaforth and Cameron Brigade 152nd (1st Highland) Brigade 152nd (Seaforth and Cameron) Brigade
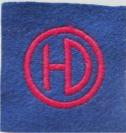
- 51st (Highland) Division's insignia from 1940 onwards
- Active: 1889–1919; 1920–1940; 1940–1946
- Country: United Kingdom
- Branch: Territorial Army
- Type: Infantry
- Size: Brigade
- Part of: 51st (Highland) Division
- Garrison/HQ: Inverness
- Engagements: World War I: Battle of Festubert; Battle of the Somme; Battle of Arras; Third Battle of Ypres; Battle of Cambrai; German spring offensive; Hundred Days Offensive; World War II; Battle of France; Battle of El Alamein; Tunisian campaign; Sicilian campaign; Normandy campaign; Reichswald; Rhine crossing

Commanders
- Notable commanders: James Dick-Cunyngham; Douglas Wimberley; Gordon MacMillan; James Cassels

152nd Infantry Brigade was a formation of Britain's Territorial Force/Territorial Army that was part of 51st (Highland) Division in both World Wars. From its origins in the 19th Century Volunteer Force it was based in Inverness and was composed of Highland battalions. It served on the Western Front in World War I, and after it was captured at Saint-Valery-en-Caux early in World War II it was reformed from its 2nd Line and saw action in North Africa, Sicily and North West Europe.

== Volunteer Force ==
The Volunteer Force of part-time military units formed in Great Britain after an invasion scare in 1859 had no higher organisation than the battalion until the Stanhope Memorandum of December 1888 proposed a comprehensive mobilisation scheme. Under this scheme Volunteer infantry battalions would assemble in their own brigades at key points in case of war. In peacetime these brigades provided a structure for collective training. Five Volunteer Infantry Brigades were initially formed in Scotland, covering the Highlands, the South of Scotland, and the Clyde, Forth and Tay estuaries. The Highland Brigade initially comprised the three Volunteer Battalions (VBs) of the Seaforth Highlanders (Ross-shire Buffs, The Duke of Albany's), the single VB of the Queen's Own Cameron Highlanders, and three of the VBs of the Gordon Highlanders. The first commander of the Highland Brigade was Colonel E.H.D. Macpherson of Cluny. However, the original Volunteer brigades were too large and cumbersome, and in 1890 two VBs of the Gordons were separated to join a new Aberdeen Brigade, leaving the Highland Brigade with the following organisation:

- Headquarters (HQ) at 10 Bank Street, Inverness
- 1st (Ross Highland) Volunteer Battalion, Seaforth Highlanders, at Dingwall
- 1st (Sutherland Highland) Sutherland Volunteer Rifle Corps (2nd VB, Seaforth Highlanders), at Golspie
- 3rd (Morayshire) Volunteer Battalion, Seaforth Highlanders, at Elgin
- 6th Volunteer Battalion Gordon Highlanders, at Keith
- 1st (Inverness Highland) Volunteer Battalion, Cameron Highlanders at Inverness
- Bearer Company, Medical Staff Corps
- Supply Detachment Army Service Corps

In the reorganisation at the end of the Second Boer War in 1902, the 6th Gordons VB transferred to its own brigade, and the Highland Brigade was renamed the Seaforth and Cameron Brigade, under the officer commanding the regimental district. In 1906 permanent commanders were appointed to the Volunteer Brigades, drawn from retired colonels, Col H.H.L. Malcolm being appointed to the Seaforth and Cameron Brigade.

== Territorial Force ==
In 1908 the Volunteers were subsumed into the new Territorial Force (TF) and the Seaforth and Cameron Brigade became the first brigade in the TF's new Highland Division. The battalions had been reorganised as follows:

- HQ at the Drill Hall, Margaret Street, Inverness
- 4th (Ross Highland) Battalion, Seaforths at Dingwall
- 5th (The Sutherland and Caithness Highland) Battalion, Seaforths, at Golspie
- 6th (Morayshire) Battalion, Seaforths, at Elgin
- 4th Battalion, Camerons, at Inverness, with detachments at Fort Augustus, Fort William and on Skye

== World War I ==
=== Mobilisation ===
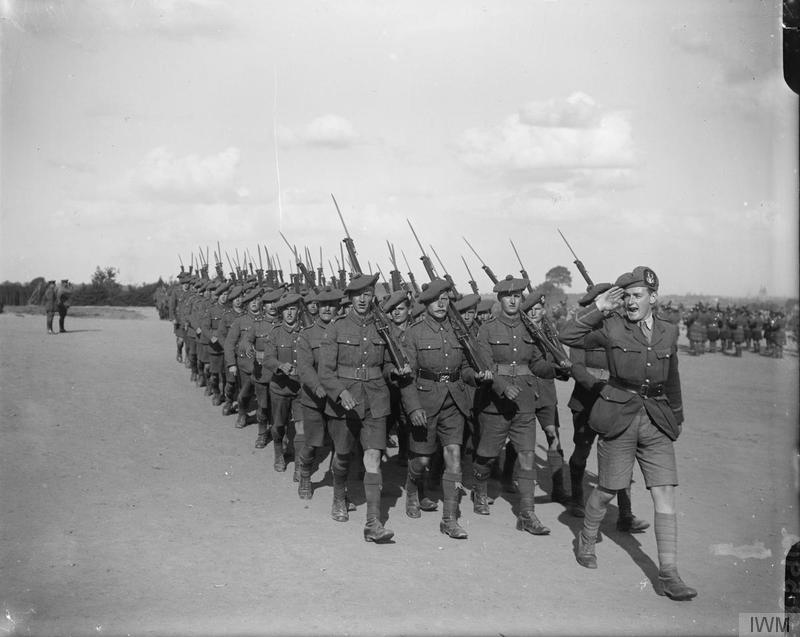
Men of the 152nd (Seaforth and Cameron) Infantry Brigade, 51st (Highland) Division, marching past Field Marshal Sir Douglas Haig at School Camp, St. Janster Biezen, 21 August 1917.

The Highland Division was at its annual camp in 1914 when it received orders to mobilise at 17.35 on 4 August and by 17 August had concentrated at its war stations round Bedford as part of First Army in Central Force. Although the TF was intended as a home defence force and its members could not be compelled to serve outside the UK, units were invited to volunteer for overseas service and the majority did so. Those who did not volunteer were formed into 2nd Line units and formations to train the mass of volunteers who were coming forward; these were given the prefix '2/' to distinguish them from the 1st Line. (191st (2nd Seaforth and Cameron Highlanders) Brigade formed in 64th (2nd Highland) Division as a 2nd Line duplicate; this never saw action, but supplied drafts to the 1st Line.) Individual TF battalions began being sent to the Western Front to reinforce the British Expeditionary Force (BEF): the 1/4th Seaforths landed in France on 7 November, and the 1/4th Camerons on 23 February 1915. (Although both battalions eventually returned to the Highland Division, they were assigned to a different brigade.) In April the whole of the Highland Division prepared to join the BEF, and two battalions were transferred to the Seaforth and Cameron Brigade from the independent Argyll and Sutherland Brigade on 15 April. From now on the Seaforth and Cameron Brigade, as the senior brigade in the division, was designated 1st Highland Brigade. The division completed its concentration on the Western Front on 6 May, and on 12 May it was designated 51st (Highland) Division, the brigade becoming 152nd (1st Highland) Brigade.

=== Order of Battle ===
For the rest of the war, 152nd (1st Highland) Brigade had the following composition:

- 1/5th (Sutherland & Caithness) Battalion, Seaforths
- 1/6th (Morayshire) Battalion, Seaforths
- 1/6th (Renfrewshire) Battalion, Argyll and Sutherland Highlanders (A&SH) – left on 1 June 1916 and transferred to 5th Division as pioneers
- 1/8th (Argyllshire) Battalion, A&SH – transferred to 61st (2nd South Midland) Division 7 February 1918
- 152nd Brigade Machine Gun Company – formed 16 January 1916; transferred to No 51 Battalion, Machine Gun Corps 10 February 1918
- 1/6th Battalion, Gordons – transferred from Line of Communication Troops 1 June 1916; absorbed 1/7th Gordons from 153rd (2nd Highland) Bde 6 October 1918 to form 6th/7th Gordons
- 4/4 Trench Mortar Battery – joined 17 March, became 152/1 TM Bty
- 152/2 Trench Mortar Battery – joined by May 1916
- 152nd Brigade Trench Mortar Battery – formed by July 1916 from 152/1 and 152/2 TM Btys

=== Service ===
152nd (1st Highland) Brigade was engaged in the following actions:

1915

- Battle of Festubert, 19–25 May
- Second Action of Givenchy, 15–16 June

1916

- Battle of the Somme:
  - Attacks on High Wood, 21–30 July
  - Battle of the Ancre, 13–18 November
  - Capture of Beaumont-Hamel, 13 November

1917

- Battle of Arras:
  - First Battle of the Scarpe, 9–11 April
  - Second Battle of the Scarpe, 23–24 April
  - Capture and Defence of Rœux, 13–16 May
- Third Battle of Ypres:
  - Battle of Pilckem Ridge, 31 July–2 August
  - Battle of the Menin Road Ridge, 20–24 September
- Battle of Cambrai:
  - The Tank Attack, 10–21 November
  - Capture of Bourlon Wood, 23 November
  - German Counter-Attacks, 1–3 December

1918

- German spring offensive:
  - Battle of St Quentin,21–23 March
  - First Battle of Bapaume, 24–25 March
- Battle of the Lys:
  - Battle of Estaires (9–11 April)
  - Battle of Hazebrouck (12–15 April)

51st (H) Division's casualties during the Battle of the Lys were so great that on 12 April it was reduced to a composite brigade under the Commander, Royal Engineers, ('Fleming's Force') and each brigade was reduced to battalion strength. 152nd Brigade Composite Battalion (100 men) was commanded by Major A.A. Duff under Lieutenant-Colonel J.M. Scott, commanding 152nd and 153rd Brigades. The division was withdrawn after the battle and underwent a long period of rest and reinforcement in a quiet sector.

- Battle of Tardenois 20 –31 July
- Hundred Days Offensive:
  - Battle of the Scarpe, 26–30 August
  - Pursuit to the Selle, 11–12 October
  - Battle of the Selle, 17–25 October

After the Armistice with Germany in November 1918 51st (H) Division was billeted in the Scheldt Valley where demobilisation got under way. By the middle of March 1919 the remaining units had been reduced to cadre strength and left for home.

=== Commanders ===
The following officers commanded 152nd (1st Highland) Brigade during the war:

- Col D.A. Macfarlane, 9 May 1911 (Brigadier-General from mobilisation)
- Brig-Gen W.C. Ross, 13 November 1914
- Lt-Col A.H. Spooner, 9 July 1916
- Brig-Gen H.P. Burn, 19 July 1916
- Brig-Gen James Dick-Cunyngham, 7 April 1918, captured 12 April 1918
- Maj A.A. Duff, commanding 152d Brigade Composite Bn 13 April 1918
- Lt-Col J.M. Scott, commanding 152nd and 153rd Brigades 13 April 1918
- Brig-Gen E.I. de S. Thorpe, 17 April 1918
- Brig-Gen R. Laing, 28 April 1918
- Brig-Gen W.H.E. Segrave, 8 August 1918

== Interwar ==
The TF was reconstituted on 7 February 1920 and was reorganised as the Territorial Army (TA) the following year, with some units having merged. The brigade was reformed as 152nd (Seaforth and Cameron) Brigade:

- HQ at Drill Hall, Academy Street, Inverness
- 4th/5th (The Ross, Sutherland and Caithness) Bn, Seaforths, at Drill Hall, Golspie
- 6th (The Morayshire) Bn, Seaforths, at Drill Hall, Elgin
- 6th (The Banff and Donside) Bn, Gordons, at Drill Hall, Keith
- 4th Bn, Camerons, at Drill Hall, Rose Street, Inverness

== World War II ==
=== Mobilisation ===
In the months before the outbreak of war the TA was doubled in size, with most units and formations creating duplicates. 26 Infantry Brigade was formed in 9th (Highland) Infantry Division as the 2nd Line for 152 Brigade, with some of its battalions formed by reversing the mergers of the 1920s. After the TA was mobilised on 1 September 1939 152 Brigade had the following composition:

- 4th Bn, Seaforths
- 6th Bn, Seaforths – transferred to 5th Division 30 March 1940
- 4th Bn, Camerons
- 152nd Infantry Brigade Anti-Tank Company – formed 28 January 1940
- 2nd Bn, Seaforths – joined from 5th Division 30 March 1940

=== Battle of France ===
The 51st (H) Division joined the British Expeditionary Force (BEF) in France, 152 Bde landing on 27 January 1940. The BEF had a policy of exchanging Regular and TA units to even up experience across formations: on 4 March 6 Seaforths was exchanged for 2nd Seaforths from 5th Division. However, when the Phoney War ended with the German invasion of the Low Countries on 10 May, 51st (H) Division was detached and serving under French command on the Saar front. Cut off from the rest of the BEF, which was evacuated from Dunkirk, it retreated to the coast where most of the division was forced to surrender at Saint-Valery-en-Caux on 12 June.

The decision was made to reconstitute the famous 51st (Highland) Division by redesignating its duplicate formation, the 9th (Highland) Division in Scottish Command, on 7 August. At the same time 152 Brigade was recreated by redesignating 26 Brigade.

=== Reconstituted Brigade ===
The brigade was reconstituted as follows:

- 2nd Bn Seaforths – reformed 9 September 1940
- 4th/5th Bn, Seaforths – became simply 5th Seaforths on 5 April 1941
- 7th Bn, Seaforths – left 23 August 1940
- 152nd Infantry Brigade Anti-Tank Company – reformed 1 September 1940, left 14 December 1940 and became A Company, 51st (Highland) Reconnaissance Battalion, 8 January 1941

=== Service ===
51st (H) Division sailed for Egypt on 16 June 1942 and 152 Bde was engaged in the following actions under its command during the war:

1942

- Western Desert campaign:
  - Second Battle of El Alamein, 23 October–4 November

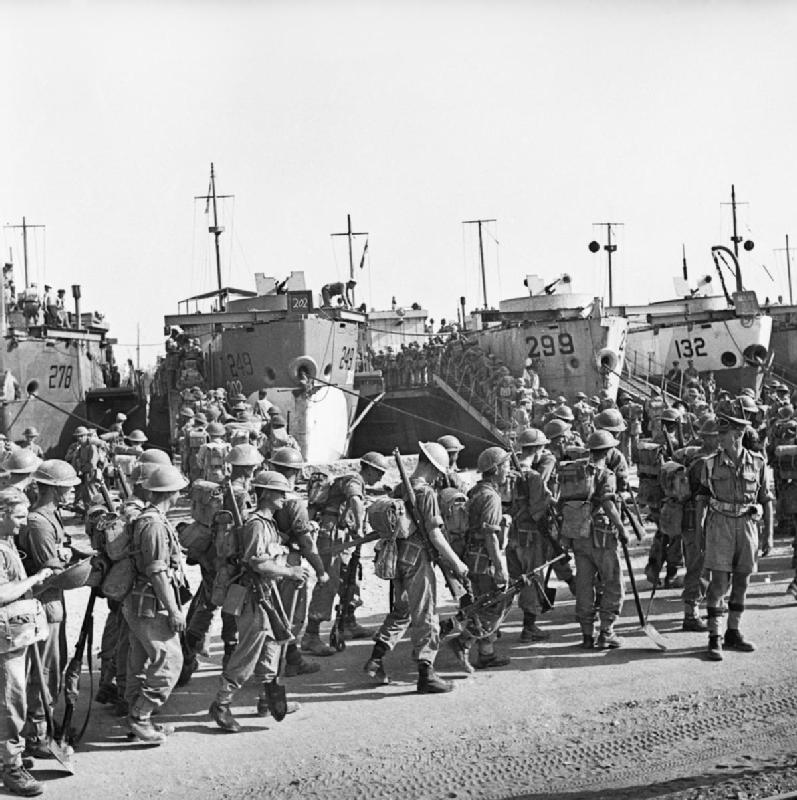
Men of 2nd Seaforth Highlanders embarking onto landing craft at Sousse, Tunisia, en route for Sicily, 5 July 1943.

1943

- Tunisian campaign:
  - Battle of Medenine, 6 March
  - Battle of the Mareth Line, 16–31 March
  - Battle of Wadi Akarit, 6–7 April
  - Enfidaville (Operation Vulcan) 19–29 April
  - Tunis (Operation Strike), 5–12 May
- Sicilian campaign:
  - Landings (Operation Husky) 9–12 July
  - Adrano (Battle of Centuripe), 29 July–3 August

1944

- Normandy campaign:
  - Operation Goodwood, 18–23 July
  - Battle of Falaise, 7–22 August
  - Le Havre (Operation Astonia), 10–12 September
- Reichswald (Operation Veritable), 8 February–10 March
- Rhine Crossing (Operation Plunder), 23 March –1 April

=== Commanders ===
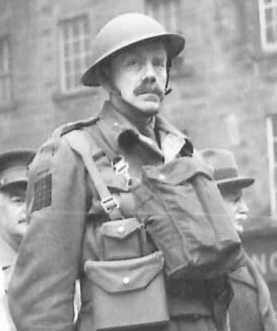
Brig Douglas Wimberley with 152 Bde in Inverness, 1941.

The following officers commanded 152 Bde during the war:

- Brigadier H.W.V Stewart, 23 February 1936, captured 12 June 1940
- Brig I.K. Thomson, 7 August 1940
- Brig Douglas Wimberley, 13 September 1940
- Brig D. Murray, 17 May 1941
- Lt-Col J. Sorel-Cameron, acting 17 June 1943
- Brig Gordon MacMillan, 25 June 1943
- Brig J.A. Oliver, 22 August 1943
- Brig D.H. Haugh, 12 December 1943
- Brig James Cassels, 17 June 1944
- Lt-Col Derek Lang, acting 28 May 1945
- Brig J.A. Grant Peterkin, 14 June 1945

== Postwar ==
When the TA was reformed on 1 January 1947, 51st (Highland) and 52nd (Lowland) Divisions were merged as 51st/52nd Scottish Division, and 152 Bde was not reformed; the remaining Seaforth and Cameron TA battalions joined the Gordons in 153 (Highland) Bde.
