= Edward Maitland-Makgill-Crichton =

British Army general (1916–2009)

Major-General Edward Maitland-Makgill-Crichton OBE
- Born: 23 November 1916; Hereford, Herefordshire, England
- Died: 22 December 2009 (aged 93); Edinburgh, Scotland
- Relatives: Henry Maitland-Makgill-Crichton (uncle)
- Military career
- Allegiance: United Kingdom
- Branch: British Army
- Service years: 1937−1968
- Rank: Major-General
- Service number: 71206
- Unit: Queen's Own Cameron Highlanders
- Commands: 1st Battalion, Liverpool Scottish; 152nd Infantry Brigade; 51st (Highland) Division
- Conflicts: Second World War
- Awards: Officer of the Order of the British Empire

Major-General Edward Maitland-Makgill-Crichton OBE (23 November 1916 – 22 December 2009) was a senior British Army officer.

== Early life and education ==
Maitland-Makgill-Crichton was born on 23 November 1916 in Hereford, Herefordshire, England. He was educated at Bedford School and at the Royal Military College, Sandhurst.

== Military career ==
He was commissioned into the Queen's Own Cameron Highlanders on 28 January 1937.

During the Second World War he saw action at the Second Battle of El Alamein in October 1942 and the Battle of El Agheila in December 1942 as well as the Allied invasion of Sicily in July 1943 and the subsequent Italian campaign. He then took part in the Normandy landings and the advance through North West Europe.

After the war, he served joined the British Commonwealth Occupation Force in Japan in 1946 and then served in North Africa and saw action in the Suez Canal Zone during the Suez Crisis. He became commanding officer of the 1st Battalion, Liverpool Scottish in 1958, commander of the 152nd Infantry Brigade in January 1962 and Deputy Director of Army Staff Duties at the Ministry of Defence in February 1965. His last appointment was as General Officer Commanding, 51st (Highland) Division in February 1966 before retiring in 1968.

Maitland-Makgill-Crichton died in Edinburgh on 22 December 2009.

Military offices
Preceded by Ian Robertson	GOC 51st (Highland) Division; 1966–1968	Succeeded by Post disbanded
