= Duncan Alwyn Macfarlane =

British Army general

Brigadier-General Duncan Alwyn Macfarlane CB DSO
- Born: 19 November 1857
- Died: 9 April 1941 (aged 83) Dunian Park, Inverness, Scotland
- Allegiance: United Kingdom
- Branch: British Army
- Rank: Brigadier-General
- Commands: West India Regiment; King's Own Scottish Borderers
- Conflicts: First World War
- Awards: Companion of the Order of the Bath
- Education: Magdalen College, Oxford

Brigadier-General Duncan Alwyn Macfarlane, CB, DSO (19 November 1857 – 9 April 1941) was a British Army officer, most notably colonel of the King's Own Scottish Borderers from 1928 to 1938.

The son of the Reverend James Duncan Macfarlane, Macfarlane was educated at Magdalen College, Oxford, where he matriculated in 1876, graduating B.A. at St. Alban Hall in 1879.

He was commissioned a lieutenant in 1st West India Regiment on 6 May 1882, and promoted to captain on 11 January 1888 when he transferred to the King's Own Scottish Borderers. Later that year he joined the 2nd Battalion of his regiment as it was sent to Sudan during the Mahdist War, and he took part in the Battle of Suakin (December 1888) and operations on the Sudan Frontier in 1889. He was adjutant of the 2nd Battalion as it took part in the Chitral Expedition under General Sir Robert Low in 1895, then served in the Tirah campaign in the North-West Frontier Province 1897–98, for which he received the brevet rank of major on 20 May 1898.

He was promoted substantive major on 5 January 1900, and was with the 1st Battalion, KOSB as it went to South Africa to serve in the Second Boer War from 1900 to 1902. He took part in operations in the Orange Free State February to March 1900, including action at Vet River and Zand River; then moved to Transvaal where he took part in the occupation of Johannesburg and Pretoria in June 1900 and was present at the action on Zilikat's Nek in August 1900. He served with the battalion in Transvaal throughout the guerrilla phase of the war, and was temporary in command of the battalion from 20 February to 20 April 1902. For his service in the war he was mentioned in despatches, received the Queen's Medal with three clasps, was appointed a Companion of the Distinguished Service Order (DSO), and received the brevet rank of lieutenant colonel on 22 August 1902.

He was promoted to full lieutenant colonel in November 1905, when he took command of a battalion of the KOSB, which he commanded for four years until November 1909 when he relinquished command and was placed on half-pay. He was promoted to colonel the next day and had, while still commanding his battalion, been made a brevet colonel in April 1907.

In May 1911 he came off half-pay in order to command a brigade of the Territorial Force.

He later served on the Western Front in World War I. He was promoted to temporary brigadier general in August 1914.

In later life he was a deputy lieutenant of Inverness. He died at the age of 83 at Dunian Park, Inverness; and his wife Edith in 1961.

Honorary titles
Preceded by Douglas Haig, 1st Earl Haig	Colonel of the King's Own Scottish Borderers; 1928–1938	Succeeded by Sir Edward Nicholson Broadbent
