= Battle of Festubert =

Western Front battle of 1915 in World War I

- Part of the Second Battle of Artois on the Western Front of the First World War
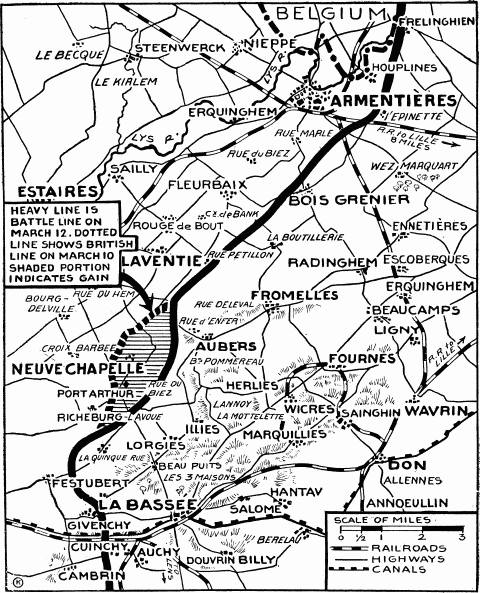
- Front line following the Battle of Neuve Chapelle, (10–13 March 1915)
Date	15–25 May 1915
Location	South of Neuve Chapelle, France 50°32′38″N 2°44′10″E
Result	German victory
Territorial changes	Minor British gains

Belligerents
British Empire: Canada; India; United Kingdom	German Empire: Bavaria; Prussia

Commanders and leaders
(United Kingdom of Great Britain and Ireland) Douglas Haig	(German Empire) (Kingdom of Bavaria) Crown Prince Rupprecht

Strength
6 divisions	3 divisions

Casualties and losses
(British Empire) 16,648	(German Empire) c. 5,000

The Battle of Festubert (15–25 May 1915) was an attack by the British army in the Artois region of France on the western front during World War I. The offensive formed part of a series of attacks by the French Tenth Army and the British First Army in the Second Battle of Artois (3 May – 18 June 1915). After the failure of the breakthrough attempt by the First Army in the attack at Aubers Ridge (9 May 1915) tactics of a short hurricane bombardment and an infantry advance with unlimited objectives, were replaced by the French practice of slow and deliberate artillery-fire intended to prepare the way for an infantry attack.

A continuous three-day bombardment by the British heavy artillery was planned, to cut wire and demolish German machine-gun posts and infantry strong points. The German defences were to be captured by a continuous attack, by one division from Rue du Bois to Chocolat Menier Corner and by a second division 600 yd (550 m) north, which was to capture the German trenches to the left of Festubert. The objectives were 1,000 yd (910 m) forward, rather than the 3,000 yd (1.7 mi; 2.7 km) depth of advance attempted at Aubers Ridge. The battle was the first British attempt at attrition.

== Background ==
=== Tactical developments ===
The Battle of Festubert was the continuation of the Battle of Aubers Ridge (9 May) and part of the larger French Second Battle of Artois. The resumption of the British offensive was intended to assist the French Tenth Army offensive against Vimy Ridge near Arras, by attracting German divisions to the British front, rather than reinforcing the defenders opposite the French.

== Prelude ==
=== British plan ===
The attack was made by the British First Army (General Sir Douglas Haig) against a salient in the German lines between Neuve Chapelle to the north and the village of Festubert to the south. The assault was planned along a 3 mi (4.8 km) front and would initially be made by Indian and British troops of the Garhwal Brigade, 7th (Meerut) Division together with the 5th and 6th Infantry Brigades of the 2nd Division. Starting at 11:30 pm on 15 May, this would be the first British night attack of the war.

== Battle ==
The battle was preceded by a 60-hour bombardment by 433 artillery pieces that fired about 100,000 shells. This bombardment failed to significantly damage the front line defences of the German 6th Army and the initial advance only made progress on the 6th Brigade front in good weather conditions. The attack was continued at 3:15 pm on 16 May by the original brigades plus the 7th Division which opened a front further south. Progress was again limited with casualties very high; on 17 May the 4th Guards Brigade of the 2nd Division relieved elements of the 7th Division but made minor advances only. By 19 May, the 2nd Division and 7th Division had to be withdrawn due to their casualties, with the main objectives of 15 May still in German hands. On 18 May, the 1st Canadian Division, assisted by the 51st (Highland) Division, attacked but made little progress in the face of German artillery-fire. The British dug in at the new front line in heavy rain. The Germans brought up reinforcements and strengthened their defences. From 20 to 25 May, the attack was resumed but again made little progress. The offensive had resulted in a 1.9 mi (3 km) advance.

== Aftermath ==
=== Casualties ===
The British suffered 16,648 casualties from 15/16 to 25 May; the 2nd Division suffered 5,445 casualties, the 7th Division 4,123, the 47th Division 2,355, the Canadian Division 2,204 and the 7th (Meerut) Division 2,521 casualties. The German defenders suffered c. 5,000 casualties, including 800 men taken prisoner. French casualties during the Second Battle of Artois were 102,533 men and German casualties were 73,072.

== Commemoration ==
The 100th anniversary of the battle saw it commemorated; some of the most poignant were those held in the Highlands of Scotland, in particular in shinty-playing communities, which were affected disproportionately by losses in the battle. Skye Camanachd and Kingussie Camanachd, representing two areas which lost a great many men, were joined by the British Forces shinty team, SCOTS Camanachd for a weekend of commemorations, lectures, memorial services and shinty matches on the weekend of 15–17 May 2015 in Portree, Isle of Skye. A week later, the Beauly Shinty Club renamed their pavilion after the Paterson brothers, Donald and Alasdair, who were killed in the battle and were part of their 1913 Camanachd Cup winning side. Donald's bagpipes were recovered with his other effects in the early 1980s and were played at both commemorations.

== See also ==
- List of Canadian battles during World War I
