= Royal Newfoundland Regiment =

Primary Reserve infantry regiment of the Canadian Army

- The badge of The Royal Newfoundland Regiment.
- Active: 1949–present; 1939–1946; 1914–1919; 1803–1816; 1795–1802
- Country: Great Britain (1795–1801); United Kingdom (1801–1907); Newfoundland (1907–1949); Canada (1949–present)
- Branch: Canadian Army
- Type: Line Infantry
- Role: Light Infantry
- Size: Two Battalions
- Part of: 37 Canadian Brigade Group
- Garrison/HQ: RHQ – St. John's; 1st Battalion – St. John's; 2nd Battalion – HQ & A COY Corner Brook; B COY – Grand Falls-Windsor; C COY – Stephenville
- Nickname: The Blue Puttees
- Motto: Better than the Best
- Colors: Scarlet and White
- March: Quick – The Banks of Newfoundland; Slow – The Garb of Old Gaul
- Mascot: Sable Chief - Newfoundland Dog
- Anniversaries: ANZAC Day – 25 April; Memorial Day – 1 July
- Engagements: United Irish Uprising in Newfoundland; War of 1812; First World War; Second World War; War in Afghanistan
- Battle honours: Detroit; Maumee; Defence of Canada, 1812‍–‍1815; Somme, 1916; Albert (Beaumont-Hamel) 1916; Le Transloy; Arras, 1917; Scarpe, 1917; Ypres, 1917‍–‍1918; Langemarck, 1917; Poelcappelle; Cambrai, 1917; Lys; Bailleul; Kemmel; Courtrai; France and Flanders, 1916‍–‍1918; Gallipoli, 1915‍–‍1916; Egypt, 1915‍–‍1916

Commanders
- Current commander: 1st Bn: LCol Kyle Strong, MB, CD; 2nd Bn: LCol Kyle Strong, MB, CD
- Colonel-in-Chief: Anne, Princess Royal
- Honorary Colonel: Joan Marie Aylward
- Notable commanders: Lt. Col Thomas Skinner; Lt. Gen John Skerrett; Lt. Col Arthur Lovell Hadow; Col James Forbes-Robertson; Col. Joseph O'Driscoll

The Royal Newfoundland Regiment (R NFLD R) is a Primary Reserve infantry regiment of the Canadian Army. It is part of the 2nd Canadian Division's 37 Canadian Brigade Group.

Predecessor units trace their origins to 1795, and since 1949 Royal Newfoundland Regiment has been a unit of the Canadian Army. During the First World War the battalion-sized Newfoundland Regiment was the only North American unit to fight in the Gallipoli campaign of 1915. Later in the war the regiment was virtually wiped out at Beaumont Hamel on 1 July 1916, the first day of the Battle of the Somme, but was rebuilt and continued to serve throughout France and Belgium until the armistice, then serving as part of the British Army of the Rhine in 1919. In December 1917, George V bestowed the regiment with the right to use the prefix "Royal" before its name. It was the only military unit to receive this honour during the First World War.

During the Second World War, the Newfoundland Militia was raised for defence and renamed the Newfoundland Regiment in 1943. The regiment remained in a home-defence role and also trained recruits for the two regiments of the Royal Artillery that were recruited in Newfoundland for overseas service. In 1949, Newfoundland joined Canada as the latter's 10th province and part of the Terms of Union required the re-creation of the Royal Newfoundland Regiment as the primary militia unit for the province. The regiment is ranked last in the Royal Canadian Infantry Corps' order of precedence.

== Structure ==
- 1 Battalion
  - 1 Battalion HQ
  - A Company
  - B Company
- 2 Battalion
  - 2 Battalion HQ
  - A Company
  - B Company
  - C Company
- The Royal Newfoundland Regiment Band

== Predecessor units ==
=== Militia units ===
Though the Royal Newfoundland Regiment traces its existence to 1795 and the establishment of the Royal Newfoundland Regiment of Foot, its origins are based in the existence of numerous local militia units raised in the colony in the eighteenth century. Prominent Newfoundland militias include Michael Gill's militia in the 1704 defence of Bonavista, the St. Mary's Militia that captured an American privateer during the American Revolution, and the 150 Newfoundland militiamen who served with the Royal Highland Emigrants during the Battle of Quebec.

=== Royal Newfoundland Regiment of Foot ===
As conflict between Revolutionary France and Britain increased in the 1790s, Britain found its overseas colonies threatened from French actions. Facing war on land and lacking the suitable land forces to defend its overseas colonies, in 1795 the British Government ordered Thomas Skinner of the Royal Engineers to raise a regiment for local defence purposes. Skinner was the engineering officer responsible for the construction of defensive positions atop Signal Hill in the aftermath of the French and Indian Wars. By the following year, strength for the regiment had reached 35 officers and 615 men, organized into 10 line infantry companies, one light infantry company, and one grenadier company. In September 1796, the French Navy was reported to be sailing for St. John's to invade the city; in response, the entirety of the Regiment of Foot erected tents atop Signal Hill and around Fort Amherst to give the appearance of a much larger force defending the city. The ruse was successful, causing the naval force to abandon any attempts to land at St. John's; instead, the navy sailed south for Bay Bulls and burned all of the houses before departing the area. In 1797 the Grenadier Company escorted Governor Waldergrave aboard HMS Latona, which had recently been the site of an unsuccessful mutiny attempt.

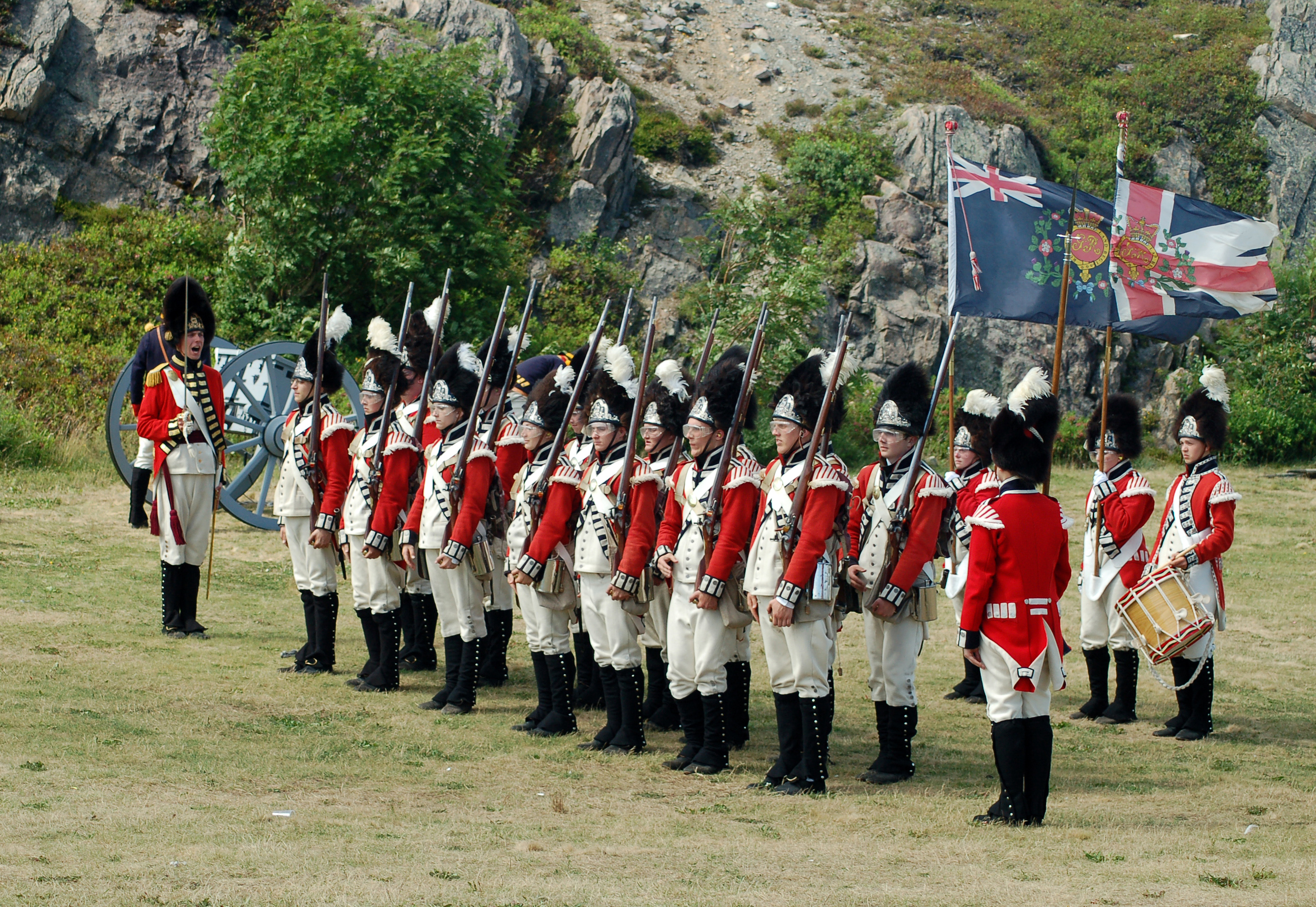
Reenactors dressed in 1795 Grenadier uniform at Signal Hill

Conditions in Newfoundland were harsh during this time period, even for the garrison soldiers. Winter food often spoiled, and a fire at Fort William in 1798 destroyed much of the regiment's bedding and medical supplies, making life that much harder for the soldiers. As a result, the desertion rate was high. Matters for the regiment further worsened in April 1800 when 50 soldiers loyal to the United Irish Movement attempt to desert en masse from Signal Hill. The alarm was sounded during their attempt, and 16 mutineers were captured. The newly appointed commanding officer, Brigadier John Skerrett (formerly of the West India Regiment) ordered the five ringleaders hanged and the remaining deserters sent by prison ship to Halifax. Questioning the loyalty of his mostly-Irish soldiers, Brigadier Skerrett ordered the regiment's line companies (the bulk of the unit) to Halifax, receiving the 66th Regiment of Foot in its place. The regiment remained in Halifax for a further two years until peace with Revolutionary France came with the Treaty of Amiens. Having no immediate need for local defence units in British North America, Britain disbanded the Newfoundland Regiment of Foot in March 1802.

=== Royal Newfoundland Regiment of Fencible Infantry ===
==== Garrison duty ====
Peace for Britain was short-lived, and in 1803 the country once again found itself at war with Napoleonic France. Brigadier Skerrett was tasked with recruiting an infantry unit consisting of ten companies in Newfoundland for the purposes of local defence. Titled the Newfoundland Regiment of Fencible Infantry, the unit consisted of many veterans of the previous Newfoundland Regiment. By 1806 the regiment numbered nearly 700 men and was given the title Royal by King George III. 'Local defence' included all of British North America, and in 1807 the regiment was deployed to Fort Anne in Nova Scotia. The regiment was again transferred in 1808, this time to the Citadel in Quebec City where it remained until the outbreak of war in 1812.

==== War of 1812 ====
The regiment, called at the time the Royal Newfoundland Regiment of Fencible Infantry, was significantly involved in the War of 1812. In May 1812, weeks before outbreak of the war with the United States, Major-General Sir Isaac Brock, commander of his Majesty's Forces in Upper Canada, deployed the regiment into smaller companies or detachments, combined with other units or regiments in defensive positions all over the province. Some were employed as marines on board naval vessels on the Great Lakes as part of the Provincial Marine. These marines were involved in a number of notable naval actions during the war, including the Battle of Lake Erie and the capture of USS Tigress and USS Scorpion.

Battles in which elements of the regiment took part included: Skirmish at Canard River 16 July 1812, Battle of Detroit 16 August 1812, Battle of Matilda 16 September 1812, Battle of the River Raisin or Frenchtown, Michigan 22 January 1813, the British raid on Ogdensburg, New York 22 February 1813, the Battle of York (Toronto) 27 April 1813 and operations in northwest Ohio, including the siege of Fort Meigs in the spring of 1813 and the Battle of Fort George (Niagara-on-the-Lake), 25–27 May 1813. The regiment was also involved in the British Raid on Sacket's Harbour, New York on 29 May 1813, and provided soldiers who served as marines in the Battle of Lake Erie on 10 September 1813. The regiment's service continued at the Battle of the Thames or Moraviantown on 5 October 1813, and in northern Michigan at the Battle of Michilimackinac or Mackinac Island, 4 August 1814 and as part of the capture of American naval vessels Tigress 3 September 1814 and Scorpion on Upper Lake Huron on 6 September 1814.

It was largely distributed throughout the zone as attached sub-units and not as a formed battalion and was disbanded in 1816. A monument depicting a toy soldier of the 1813 Royal Newfoundland Regiment standing over a fallen American toy soldier was unveiled in Toronto in November 2008. The War of 1812 Monument in Ottawa, which is situated across from the National War Memorial, also features a soldier of the Royal Newfoundland Regiment – one of seven bronze figures which stands on top of that monument.

In 2012, on the occasion of the bicentennial of the War of 1812, the Government of Canada, responding to recommendations made by the Royal Newfoundland Regiment Advisory Council and similar recommendations made by an advisory committee to the Minister of Canadian Heritage for the War of 1812, awarded the Royal Newfoundland Regiment three battle honours. These were for the victory at Detroit in 1812, for the regiment's role at the battle of Maumee in 1813 and a general "theatre honour" ("Defence of Canada 1812–1815"), for the regiment's broader service in successful engagements throughout the War of 1812. Colours emblazoned with these battle honours were presented to the regiment's 2nd battalion in the presence of their Colonel-in-Chief, the Princess Royal, in June 2016. The ceremonies coincided with events marking the 100th anniversary of the Battle of Beaumont-Hamel.

The Royal Newfoundland Regiment of Fencible Infantry was disbanded in 1816 following the conclusion of hostilities with both America and Napoleonic France. Newfoundland did not see another military unit in the island until 1824 with the establishment of the Royal Newfoundland Veteran Companies. Although similar in name, this unit consisted of Chelsea Pensioners from the United Kingdom and was not recruited locally. The Newfoundland Companies therefore have no relationship with the Royal Newfoundland Regiment.

== Newfoundland Regiment in the First World War ==
=== Outbreak of war ===
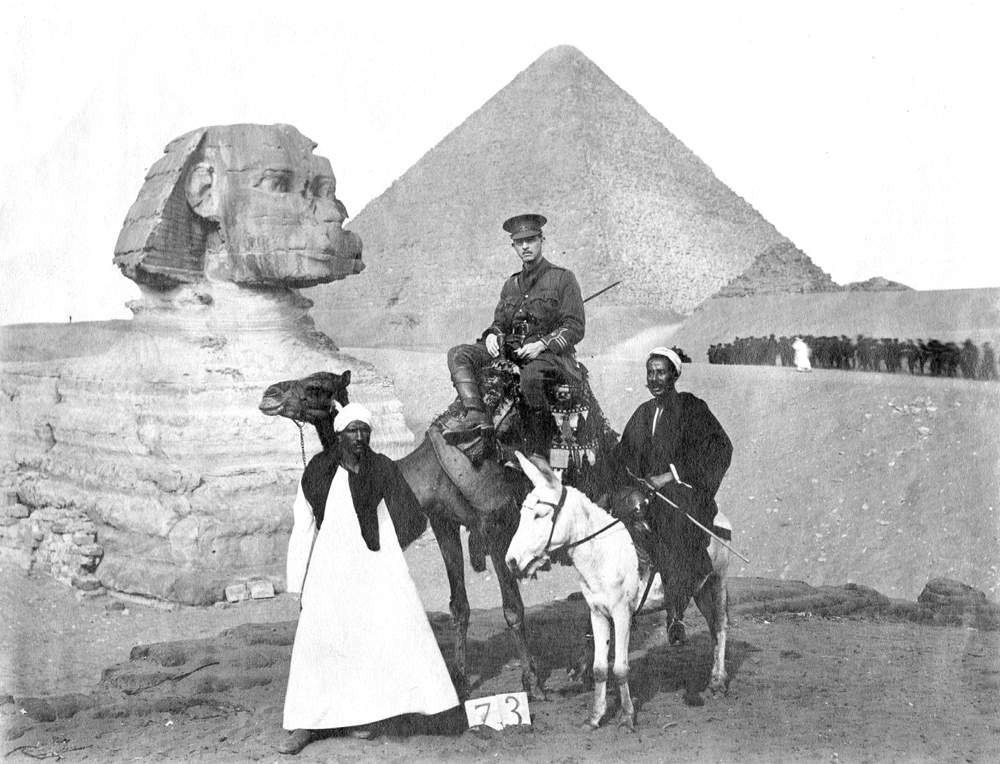
Dr. Cluny MacPherson of the Royal Newfoundland Regiment in Egypt, September 1915

During the First World War Newfoundland was a largely rural Dominion of the British Empire with a population of 240,000 people. The outbreak of the First World War in 1914 led the Government of Newfoundland to recruit a force for service with the British Army. Even though the island had not possessed any formal army organization since 1870, enough men soon volunteered that a whole battalion was formed, and later maintained throughout the war. The first recruits in the regiment were nicknamed the "Blue Puttees" due to the unusual blue colour of their puttees, which were chosen because of a shortage of dark khaki woolen material on the island. The blue puttees were quickly abandoned when the first five hundred reached England in October 1914. The headquarters for recruiting and training was supplied by the Church Lads' Brigade, as was the nucleus of the command structure. In fact, the first man to enlist was also a member of the CLB. Bermudian-born Sir Joseph Outerbridge, who had been the Commanding Officer of the CLB from 1890 to 1894, was the Vice President of the Patriotic Association of Newfoundland, which raised and maintained the Newfoundland Regiment, two of his sons serving in the regiment on the Western Front.

The regiment trained at various locations in the United Kingdom and increased from an initial contingent of 500 men to full battalion strength of 1,000 men, before being deployed. After a period of acclimatization in Egypt, the regiment was deployed at Suvla Bay on the Gallipoli peninsula with the 29th Division in support of the Gallipoli Campaign.

=== 1st Battalion ===
==== Gallipoli ====
On 20 September 1915 the regiment landed at Suvla Bay on the Gallipoli peninsula, where the British VIII Corps, IX Corps and the Australian and New Zealand Army Corps (ANZAC) had been attempting to seize control of the Dardanelles Strait from Turkey since the first landings on 25 April. At Gallipoli the 1st Newfoundland Regiment faced snipers, artillery fire and severe cold, as well as the trench warfare hazards of cholera, dysentery, typhus, gangrene and trench foot. Over the next three months thirty soldiers of the regiment were killed or mortally wounded in action and ten died of disease; 150 were treated for frostbite and exposure. Despite the terrible conditions, the Newfoundlanders stood up well. When the decision was made to evacuate all British Empire forces from the area, the regiment was chosen to be a part of the rearguard, finally withdrawing from Gallipoli with the last of the British Dardanelles Army troops on 9 January 1916. With the close of the Gallipoli Campaign the regiment spent a short period recuperating before being transferred to the Western Front in March 1916.

==== Battle of the Somme ====
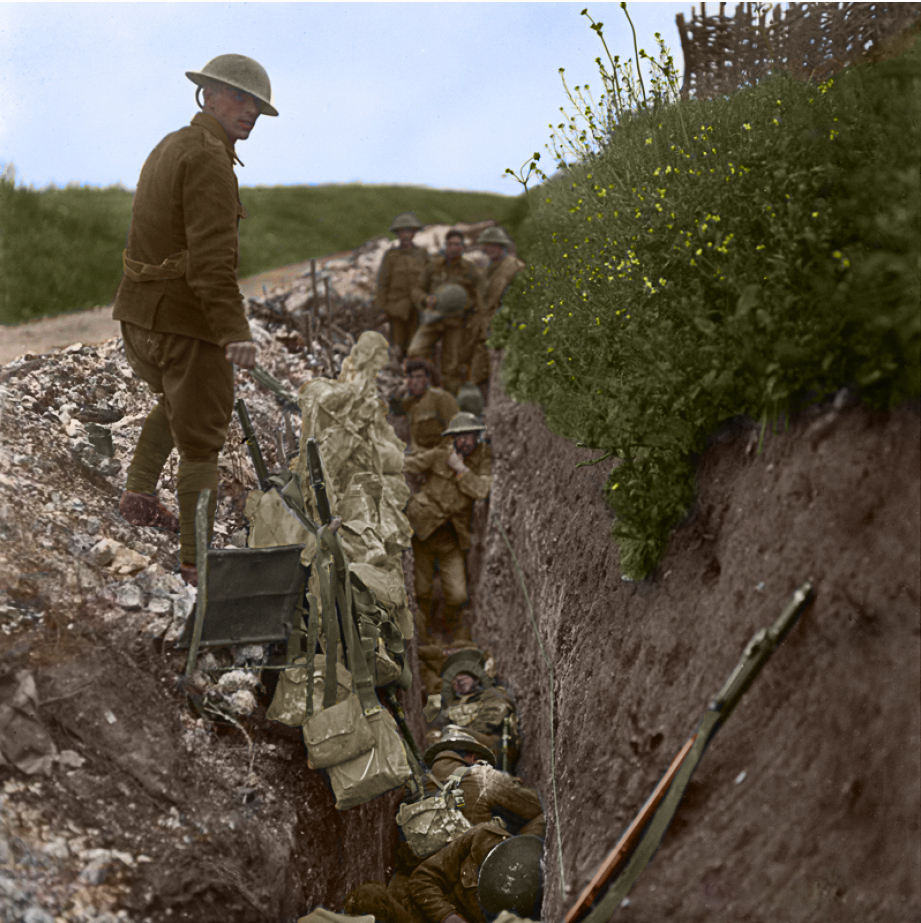
Colourized photo of soldiers in St. John's Road, a support trench, 200 m (660 ft) behind the British forward line at Beaumont Hamel, 1916

In France, the regiment regained battalion strength in preparation for the Battle of the Somme. The regiment, still in the 29th Division, went into the line in April 1916 at Beaumont-Hamel. Beaumont-Hamel was near the northern end of the 45-kilometre (28 mi) front being assaulted by the joint French and British force. The attack, originally scheduled for 29 June 1916, was postponed by two days to 1 July 1916, partly on account of inclement weather, and partly to allow more time for the artillery preparation. The 29th Division, with its three infantry brigades, faced defences manned by experienced troops of the 119th (Reserve) Infantry Regiment of the 26th (Württemberg) Reserve Division. The 119th (Reserve) Infantry Regiment had been involved in the invasion of France in August 1914 and had been manning the Beaumont-Hamel section of the line for nearly 20 months prior to the battle. The German troops had been spending a great deal of their time not only training but fortifying their position, including the construction of numerous deep dugouts and at least two tunnels.

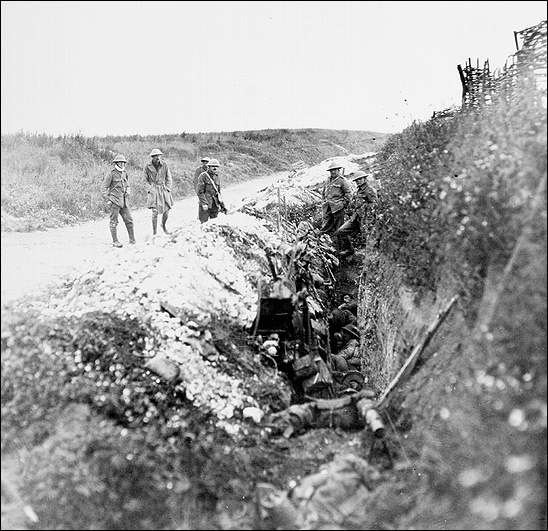
Soldiers waiting in St. John's Road support trench

The infantry assault by the 29th Division on 1 July 1916 was preceded ten minutes earlier by a mine explosion under the fortified Hawthorn Ridge Redoubt. The explosion of the 18,000-kilogram (40,000 lb) Hawthorn Mine underneath the German lines destroyed a major enemy strong point but also served to alert the German forces to the imminent attack. Following the explosion, troops of the 119th (Reserve) Infantry Regiment moved from their dugouts into the firing line, even preventing the British from taking control of the crater as they had planned. When the assault finally began, the troops from the 86th and 87th Brigade of the 29th Division were quickly stopped. With the exception of the 1st Battalion of the Royal Inniskilling Fusiliers on the right flank, the initial assault foundered in No Man's Land at and short of the German barbed wire. At divisional headquarters, Major-General Beauvoir De Lisle and his staff were trying to unravel the numerous and confusing messages coming back from observation posts, contact aircraft and the two leading brigades. There were indications that some troops had broken into and gone beyond the German first line. In an effort to exploit the perceived break in the German line he ordered the 88th Brigade, which was in reserve, to send forward two battalions to support the attack.

It was a magnificent display of trained and disciplined valour, and its assault only failed of success because dead men can advance no further.

— Major-General Sir Beauvoir De Lisle referring to the Newfoundland Regiment at Beaumont-Hamel

At 8:45 a.m. the Newfoundland Regiment and 1st Battalion, Essex Regiment received orders to move forward. The Newfoundland Regiment was at St. John's Road, a support trench 230 metres (250 yd) behind the British forward line and out of sight of the enemy. Movement forward through the communication trenches was not possible because they were congested with dead and wounded men and under shell fire. Battalion Commander Lieutenant Colonel Arthur Lovell Hadow decided to proceed immediately into an offensive formation and advance across the surface, which involved first navigating through a series of barbed wire obstacles. As they breasted the skyline behind the British first line, they were effectively the only troops moving on the battlefield and clearly visible to German machine gun positions. Most of the Newfoundland Regiment who had started forward were dead within 15 minutes of leaving St. John's Road trench. Most reached no further than the Danger Tree, a skeleton of a tree that lay in No Man's Land that was being used as a landmark. So far as can be ascertained, 22 officers and 758 enlisted were directly involved in the advance. Of these, all the officers and about 658 other ranks became casualties. Of the 780 men who went forward only 110 survived, of whom only 68 were available for roll call the following day. For all intents and purposes the Newfoundland Regiment had been entirely destroyed, the unit as a whole having suffered a casualty rate of approximately 93 percent. The only unit to suffer greater casualties during the attack was the 10th (Service) Battalion, Prince of Wales's Own (West Yorkshire Regiment), attacking west of Fricourt village.

==== After Beaumont-Hamel ====
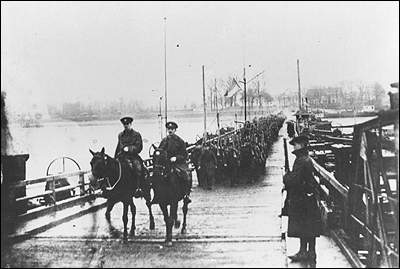
Royal Newfoundland Regiment crossing the Rhine on a pontoon bridge at Mülheim, Cologne, December 1918

Although significantly under strength, the Newfoundland Regiment continued to see service and after taking on reinforcements was back in the front line on 14 July near Auchonvillers. On 17 July the 88th Brigade was transferred to a quieter portion of the Western Front. In the weeks and months following the attack, the surviving officers wrote letters of condolence to families and relatives in Newfoundland. A period of recovery coupled with additional reinforcements eventually helped the regiment return to full strength. Six weeks later they were beating off a German gas attack in Flanders. Subsequently, they distinguished themselves in a number of battles: back on the Somme at Gueudecourt in October 1916; and on 23 April 1917, at Monchy-le-Preux during the Battle of Arras, where they lost 485 men in a day but checked a German attack. In Flanders during the Third Battle of Ypres the battalion attacked on 16 August at the Battle of Langemarck and on 9 October 1917 the battalion formed the left flank of 29th Division's attack as part of the Battle of Poelcappelle. In November 1917 at Masnières-Marcoing during the Battle of Cambrai the regiment stood its ground although outflanked and in April 1918 stemmed a German advance at Bailleul. Following a period out of the line, providing the guard force for General Headquarters at Montreuil, they joined the 28th Brigade of the 9th (Scottish) Division and were in action again at Ledegem and beyond in the advances of the Hundred Days Offensive, during which one of its youngest soldiers,Thomas Ricketts, was awarded the Victoria Cross. He is the youngest army combatant to be awarded the Victoria Cross.

=== Other battalions ===
In addition to the 1st Battalion mentioned earlier, the Royal Newfoundland Regiment raised two additional battalions during the war: the 2nd (Reserve) Battalion and the 3rd Battalion. The 2nd Battalion primarily served as the main overseas training unit for new recruits before their deployment with the 1st Battalion. It also functioned as the holding battalion for soldiers who returned to Britain due to medical reasons. The 2nd Battalion spent the majority of the war in Scotland, most famously at Ayr. The 3rd Battalion was the title given to the recruiting and training unit based in St. John's, and was the administrative home of new recruits before embarking overseas, as well as being the formation responsible for home defence. Thus, soldiers recruited in Newfoundland and Labrador were posted first to the 3rd Battalion, then the 2nd, and finally with the 1st.

In addition to its three battalions, the Royal Newfoundland Regiment played a part in the administration of the Newfoundland Forestry Corps. Formed in 1917, the corps was a uniformed pioneer unit stationed in Scotland tasked with supporting the British war effort by providing much needed timber for the war effort. Volunteers were clothed in khaki uniform and wore the distinctive Caribou cap badge of the Royal Newfoundland Regiment. In addition, some wounded officers and enlisted ranks from the 1st Battalion whose wounds prohibited them from combat service were posted to the Forestry Corps in command positions.

=== First World War honours ===
Governor Davidson strongly felt that the Newfoundland Regiment deserved special recognition for its actions during the battles of Ypres and Cambrai. His request to the British government to add the prefix Royal to the regiment's name was granted and George V bestowed the regiment with the prefix in December 1917. This was the only time during the First World War that this honour was given and only the third time in the history of the British Army that it has been given during a time of war.

== Second World War ==
When the United Kingdom declared war on Germany on 3 September 1939, Newfoundland too found itself at war. The presence of the German Navy in Atlantic waters threatened the security of the Dominion, and in September 1939 it was decided to raise the Newfoundland Militia, a local defence militia unit for the defence of the island. The Newfoundland Militia was tasked with guarding strategic positions on the island, including the dry docks, water supply, and oil reserves in St. John's and the Newfoundland Broadcasting Company's radio station in Mount Pearl. Later, these guard duties were expanded to include the maintenance of a coastal defence battery on Bell Island to protect the Wabana Iron Ore Mines, and mines and docks throughout the rest of the island. Following the Battle of France, Canada assumed responsibility for the defence of Newfoundland with the establishment of W Force. The Newfoundland Militia was immediately placed under command of W Force. The efforts of the Canadian Army to expand and train the militia to professional standards resulted in the Newfoundland Militia being re-designated the Newfoundland Regiment on 2 March 1943. The regiment stayed in a home-defence role, but in addition to these duties was also tasked with training excess recruits for the two regiments of the Royal Artillery that were recruited in Newfoundland for overseas service: the 166th (Newfoundland) Field Artillery Regiment and 59th (Newfoundland) Heavy Artillery Regiment. By the end of the Second World War, 1,668 Newfoundlanders had enlisted for service; 820 had deployed overseas with the Royal Artillery while a further 447 trained gunners were in Newfoundland awaiting transport to Europe on VE Day. 17 members of the regiment were killed on 12 December 1942, during the Knights of Columbus Hostel fire in St. John's.

== Later history ==
In 1949, after a pair of referendums, Newfoundland joined Canada as the latter's 10th province. One of the Terms of Union, Term 44, specified the re-creation of the Royal Newfoundland Regiment, which became the primary militia unit for the province. The regiment is ranked last in the Canadian Armed Forces order of precedence due to Newfoundland's entry into Canada in 1949, long after other Canadian regiments were recognized in the order of precedence. The Freedom of the City was exercised by the Royal Newfoundland Regiment in St. John's, Newfoundland and Labrador on July 1, 1963. On 1 March 1961, owing to low numbers in both units the Royal Newfoundland Regiment amalgamated with the 166th (Newfoundland) Field Artillery Regiment, RCA inheriting the guns of that unit.

Since 1992, soldiers and sub-units of the regiment have served to augment Regular Force units in Cyprus, Bosnia, Sierra Leone and Afghanistan on peacekeeping and combat missions. On 30 August 2010, Corporal Brian Pinksen died of his wounds eight days after being injured by an improvised explosive device in Afghanistan, making him the regiment's first combat fatality since the First World War.

The Regiment has also served on a number of post-Confederation domestic operations. These include providing humanitarian support following Hurricane Igor in 2010 (OP LAMA) and Hurricane Fiona (OP LENTUS-22), snow removal and transportation following the January 2020 North American storm complex (OP LENTUS-20), and arctic sovereignty patrols through regular participation in Operation Nanook. Beginning in 2019, 2RNFLDR was given responsibility for providing soldiers to an Arctic Response Company Group.

== Band ==
The Royal Newfoundland Regiment Band is presently the only military band active in Newfoundland and Labrador. Being part of the primary reserve, the band is composed of volunteer members, many of whom have studied and trained at the Logistics Training Centre Music Division at CFB Borden. The first mention of a bugle and drum band in the regiment during the First World War was made in The Fighting Newfoundlander. Its members were drawn from the regular ranks of infantry on an ad hoc basis. Many of that band's instruments were destroyed from artillery fire on the beaches of Gallipoli in September 1915. In 2018, drum used in the 1950s and 60's was donated to the regimental museum for preservation.

The basis for the modern band was founded in 1956 as the Loyal Orange Band from Topsail. Under the direction of Edgar Adams, the band was asked to serve as the band of the regiment, amalgamating in 1962 with the 166th Heavy Field Regiment Band and the band relocated from Buckmaster's Circle to its present headquarters at CFS St. John's. It performs at numerous military and civilian functions such as dinners, public visits and military parades. Among these events was the Trooping of the Colour for Queen Elizabeth The Queen Mother in 1966 and the visit of Queen Elizabeth II and Prince Philip in 1978. Other notable events have included the Presentation of Colours in 1983, Pope John Paul II's visit in 1984, the state visit by Baudouin of Belgium and the royal visit of Prince Charles in 2009.

== Lineage ==
The government of Canada does not recognize an unbroken lineage of the Royal Newfoundland Regiment to earlier units as there were gaps in existence. However, it recognizes that the regiment commemorates the history and heritage of previous units. In this respect Canada has awarded three battle honours to the regiment to commemorate the services rendered during the War of 1812 by the Royal Newfoundland Regiment of Fencible Infantry and it recognizes battle honours earned by an early iteration of the regiment during the First World War.

=== Royal Newfoundland Regiment of Foot 1795–1802 ===
- Originated 25 April 1795 when Captain Thomas Skinner of the Royal Engineers was given permission to raise a fencible infantry company consisting of six hundred men.
- Disbanded March 1802 following the signing of the Treaty of Amiens

=== Royal Newfoundland Regiment of Fencible Infantry 1803–1816 ===
- In June 1803, Brigadier General John Skerrett founds the Royal Newfoundland Regiment of Fencible Infantry.

=== Royal Newfoundland Companies ===
- 1824, the Royal Veteran Companies arrived in St. John's
- Redesignated 1842: the Royal Veteran Companies are renamed the Royal Newfoundland Companies
- Amalgamated in 1862, the Royal Newfoundland Companies were absorbed into the Royal Canadian Rifle Regiment

=== Royal Newfoundland Regiment 1914–1919 ===
- On 4 September 1914, the 23rd General Assembly of Newfoundland passed an Act authorizing the formation of the Newfoundland Regiment.
- July 1915: joined 88th Brigade, 29th Division
- 25 January 1918: the Regiment is renamed Royal Newfoundland Regiment
- April 1918: transferred to Lines of Communication owing to losses suffered during the Battle of the Lys. Appointed guards of British Expeditionary Force Headquarters
- 13 September 1918: joined 28th Infantry Brigade, 9th (Scottish) Division
- Disbanded on 26 August 1919

=== Newfoundland Militia/Regiment 1939–1945 ===
- Raised in September 1939 as a home defence unit
- Assigned to Canada's W Force in 1940
- Achieved full regimental status in 1943
- Sent 47% of its complement overseas with either Newfoundland Royal Artillery unit

=== Royal Newfoundland Regiment 1949–present ===
- Originated 24 October 1949 in St. John's, Newfoundland and Labrador, as The Newfoundland Regiment, RCIC
- Redesignated 14 December 1949 as 'Royal Newfoundland Regiment, RCIC
- Amalgamated 1 March 1961 with the 166th (Newfoundland) Field Artillery Regiment, RCA, and redesignated as Royal Newfoundland Regiment
- Reorganized 28 March 1974 as a two battalion regiment, consisting of the 1st Battalion with D, E and F companies and the 2nd Battalion with A and B companies

=== 166th (Newfoundland) Field Artillery Regiment, RCA 1949–1961 ===
- Originated 24 October 1949 in St. John's, Newfoundland and Labrador, on 24 October 1949, as the 166th (Newfoundland) Field Regiment, RCA
- Redesignated 12 April 1960 as the 166th (Newfoundland) Field Artillery Regiment, RCA
- Amalgamated 1 March 1961 with Royal Newfoundland Regiment, RCIC

== Battle honours ==
The regimental colour of 1st Battalion, Royal Newfoundland Regiment

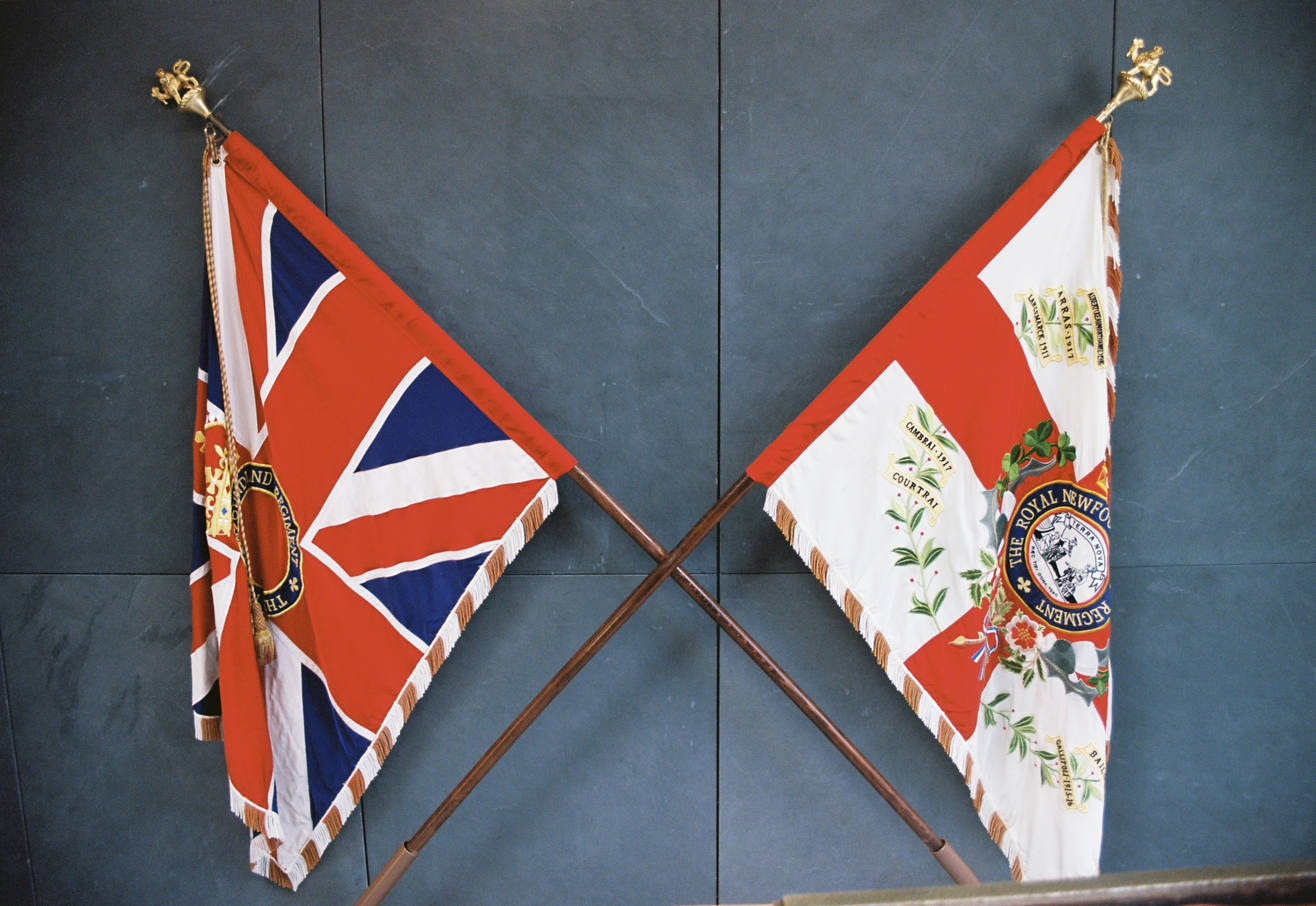
The Queen’s Colour (left) and Regimental Colour (right) of The Royal Newfoundland Regiment

In the list below, battle honours in small capitals are for large operations and campaigns and those in lowercase are for more specific battles. Bold type indicates honours authorized to be emblazoned on regimental colours

War of 1812

- Defence of Canada – 1812‍–‍1815 – Défense du Canada
- Detroit
- Maumee

All three honours were awarded in commemoration of the Royal Newfoundland Fencible Infantry and are emblazoned on the colours of the regiment's 2nd battalion.

First World War

- Somme, 1916
- **Albert (Beaumont Hamel), 1916**
- **Le Transloy**
- **Arras, 1917**
- Scarpe, 1917
- **Ypres, 1917, 1918**
- **Langemarck, 1917**
- **Poelcappelle**
- **Cambrai, 1917**
- Lys
- **Bailleul**
- Kemmel
- **Courtrai**
- France and Flanders, 1916‍–‍1918
- **Gallipoli, 1915‍–‍1916**
- Egypt, 1915‍–‍1916

The regiment did not contribute sufficient forces to meet the minimum level of 20 per cent of effective strength to qualify for the theatre honour “Afghanistan".

== Alliances ==
The regiment has alliances with the following units:

- Australia – Royal New South Wales Regiment
- United Kingdom – Royal Regiment of Scotland

== Notable members ==
- Captain Andrew Bulger
- Colonel James Forbes-Robertson
- Colonel Cluny MacPherson
- Lieutenant-Colonel Thomas Nangle
- Sergeant Thomas Ricketts
- Private Francis Lind

== See also ==
- Beaumont-Hamel Newfoundland Memorial
- Newfoundland National War Memorial
- The Fighting Newfoundlander

== Order of precedence ==
Preceded by The Toronto Scottish Regiment	Royal Newfoundland Regiment	Succeeded by Last in order of precedence of Infantry regiments

== Notes ==
=== Bibliography ===
- Nicholson, Gerald W. L. (2007) [Originally published: 1964]. The Fighting Newfoundlander: A History of the Royal Newfoundland Regiment. Carleton Library Series. Vol. 209. Montreal: McGill–Queen's University Press. ISBN 978-0-7735-3206-9.
- Parsons, W David (2003). "Newfoundland and the Great War". Canada and the Great War: Western Front Association Papers. By Western Front Association. Busch, Briton C (ed.). Montreal: McGill–Queen's University Press. ISBN 0-7735-2570-X.
- Rose, Edward; Nathanail, Paul (2000). Geology and Warfare: Examples of the Influence of Terrain and Geologists on Military Operations. London: Geological Society. ISBN 0-85052-463-6.
- Hopkins, John Castell (1916). The Canadian Annual Review of Public Affairs — 1915. Toronto: Annual Review Publishing Company Limited.
- Gogos, Frank (2015). Newfoundland Regiment in the Great War: A Guide to the Battlefields and Memorials of France, Belgium, and Gallipoli. Paradise, NL: Flanker Press. ISBN 978-1-77117-336-0.
- Farr, Don (2007). The Silent General: A Biography of Haig's Trusted Great War Comrade-in-Arms. Solihull: Helion & Company. ISBN 978-1-874622-99-4.
