= James Louis O'Donel =

First Catholic bishop to Newfoundland

The Right Reverend James Louis O'Donel
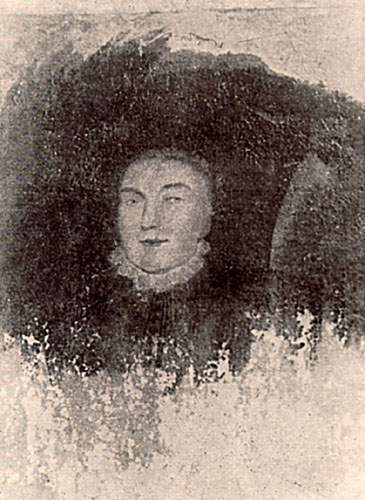
- Archdiocese: Archdiocese of St. John's
- Successor: Patrick Lambert

Personal details
- Born: James Louis O'Donel; 1737 Knocklofty, County Tipperary, Ireland
- Died: 1 April 1811 (aged 73–74) Waterford, Ireland
- Buried: Old St. Mary's Church, Clonmel, County Tipperary
- Denomination: Roman Catholic

Styles of James Louis O'Donel
- Reference style: The Right Reverend
- Spoken style: Your Excellency
- Religious style: Monsignor
- Posthumous style: none

James Louis O'Donel (1737 – April 1, 1811) was the first Roman Catholic bishop of St. John's, Newfoundland.

== Life ==
O'Donel was born in Knocklofty, County Tipperary, Ireland, into a prosperous family and received a classical Christian education before entering the Franciscan order. After the Penal Laws ceased to be rigorously enforced, he travelled to Rome to study for the priesthood, becoming ordained in 1770. He later taught philosophy and theology in Prague, and in 1777 became the Franciscan Prior in Waterford.

Following developments in England, Catholics in Newfoundland gradually gained religious liberty, made explicit by a public declaration by the Governor in 1784. After a request from Irish merchants there to Bishop William Egan, O'Donel was sent to St. John's as Prefect Apostolic the same year, largely to deal with the presence of "unlicensed" and "unruly" priests on the island. In addition to his personal popularity, one of his qualifications for the position was an ability to preach in Irish language in Newfoundland.

O'Donel found that insubordinate priests were fighting Irish battles, and set about reorganizing the Catholic Church in Newfoundland. He built a chapel in St. John's, established parishes outside the capital, and gradually brought priests under his authority. During his first few years in post, O'Donel also found that Catholic Emancipation was less than absolute, and in 1786 he was physically assaulted by the future King of England, Prince William Henry. In 1796, O'Donel was consecrated as titular bishop of Thyatira at Quebec on 21 September.

O'Donel's ministry in Newfoundland was largely characterized by trying to maintain peace, both between fellow Catholics and with the British. In 1800, imminent plans for a United Irishmen uprising by the soldiers in the St. John's garrison (including other ranks in the Royal Newfoundland Regiment, the Royal Newfoundland Fencibles and the Royal Artillery) was prevented when a terrified O'Donel, upon hearing of the plans, alerted the authorities. The 19th-century historian Charles Pedley alleged that O'Donel shared his information in violation of the Seal of Confession, but credible evidence for this claim is absent.

O'Donel's health deteriorated in the early 19th century, and he resigned his position in 1807 and returned to Ireland. He died of shock in Waterford in 1811 after suffering minor injuries in a fire.

== Views ==
Theologically, O'Donel subscribed to the Augustinian position that religion imposes a "reverential fear" on mankind's "naturally licentious" nature. This, and his belief in the essential mystery of the divine nature gave rise to his support for religious tolerance, since God's inscrutability would inevitably lead to theological disagreement, but furthermore, as he wrote to his contemporary John Jones, "an observant [C]hristian of any denomination is...a better man".

== See also ==
- United Irish Uprising
- Thomas Nash (Newfoundland) Irish fisherman, settled in Newfoundland and Labrador, Canada. Founder of Branch, Newfoundland and Labrador
