= 166th Regiment =

166th Regiment may refer to:

- 166th Infantry Regiment (United States)
- 166th Ohio Infantry Regiment, a Union Army regiment in the American Civil War
- 166th (Newfoundland) Field Artillery Regiment
