= Old St. Mary's =

Old St. Mary's, Old St Mary's, or Old Saint Mary's may refer to:

- Old St. Mary's Church (Cincinnati, Ohio), church in United States
- Old St Mary's, Walmer, church in Kent, England
- Old St. Mary's Church (Milwaukee, Wisconsin), church in United States
- Old St. Mary's Catholic Church (Fredericksburg, Texas), church in United States
- Old St Mary's Church, West Bergholt, church in Essex, England
- Old Saint Mary's Cathedral, cathedral in San Francisco, California, United States
- Old St. Mary's Church (Clonmel), church in Clonmel, Ireland
- St. Mary's Roman Catholic Church (Philadelphia), also known as Old St. Mary's
