= 1916 in the United Kingdom =

Events from the year 1916 in the United Kingdom. The year was dominated by the First World War and is noted for the Easter Rising in Ireland.

== Incumbents ==
- Monarch – George V
- Prime Minister – H. H. Asquith (Coalition) (until 5 December), David Lloyd George (Coalition) (starting 6 December)

== Events ==
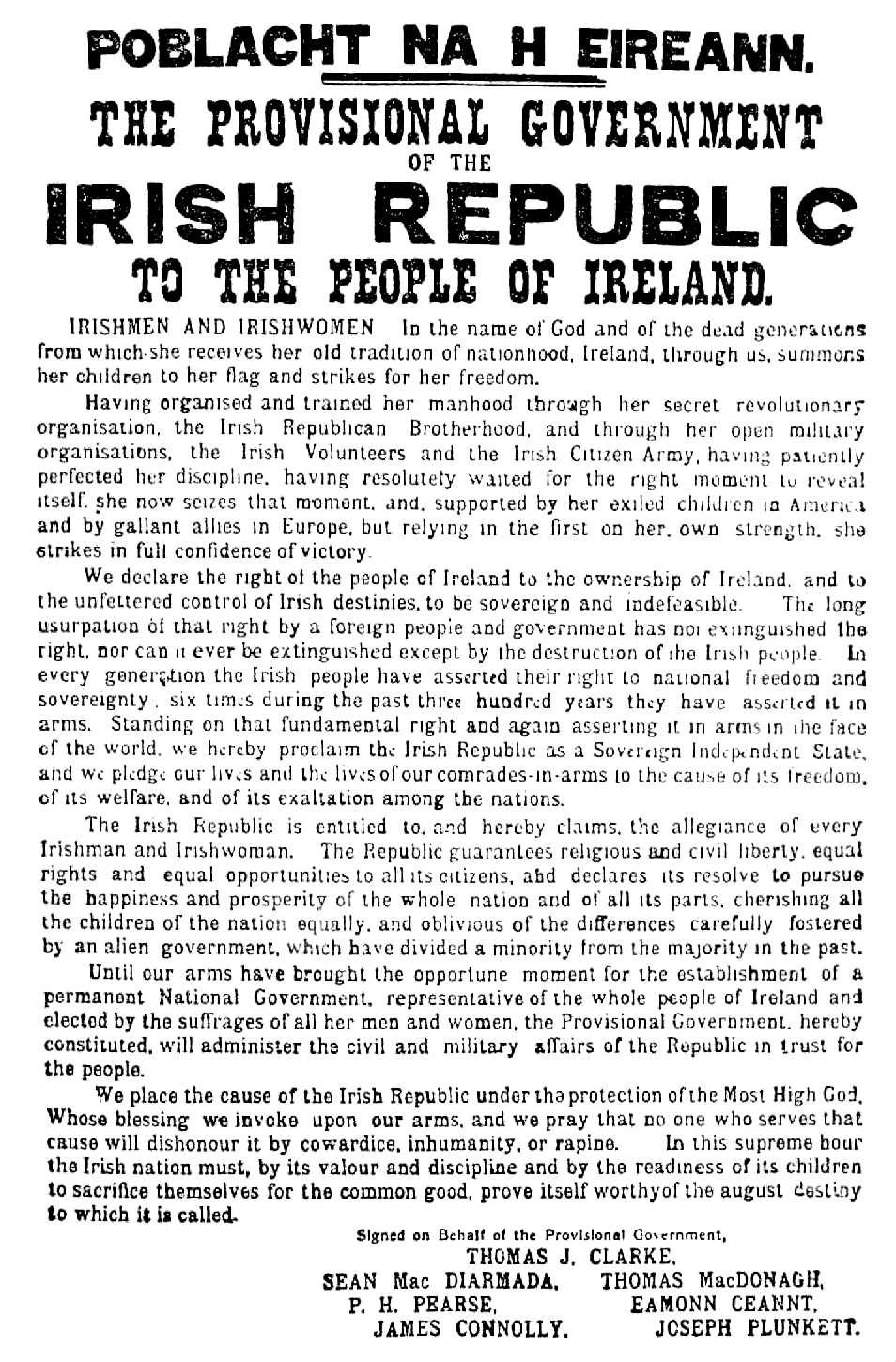
Easter Rising: Proclamation of the Irish Republic

- 1 January – the Royal Army Medical Corps carries out the first successful blood transfusion using blood that has been stored and cooled.
- 9 January – World War I: Battle of Gallipoli: last British troops evacuated from Gallipoli, as the Ottoman Empire prevails over a joint British and French operation to capture Istanbul.
- 27 January – conscription introduced by the Military Service Act; applies to unmarried men aged 18–41 from 2 March and to married men in the same age bracket from April/May; it does not extend to Ireland.
- 1 February – night-long German Zeppelin raid on the West Midlands of England, claiming at least 35 lives; Tipton suffers the heaviest losses, with 14 fatalities.
- 1 March – transfer of the National Library of Wales at Aberystwyth into its purpose-built premises is completed.
- 4 March – third war budget raises income tax to five shillings in the pound.
- 10 March – Sir Hubert Parry writes the choral setting of William Blake's poem "And did those feet in ancient time", which becomes known as "Jerusalem" (first performed 28 March at the Queen's Hall, London).
- 22 March – marriage of J. R. R. Tolkien and Edith Bratt at St. Mary Immaculate Roman Catholic Church, Warwick. They will serve as the inspiration for his fictional characters Beren and Lúthien.
- 25 March – Military Medal instituted as a military decoration for personnel of the British Army and other services below commissioned rank, for bravery in battle on land.
- 28 March – severe blizzard across the east midlands.
- 1/2–5/6 April – nightly German Navy airship raids on England.
- 2 April – munitions factory explosion at Uplees near Faversham, Kent, kills 108 men.
- 7 April – Garrick Theatre fire, Hereford: 8 young girls appearing in an amateur benefit evening performance for soldiers are killed when their costumes catch fire.
- 24–30 April – Easter Rising in Ireland: Members of the Irish Republican Brotherhood proclaim an Irish Republic and the Irish Volunteers and Irish Citizen Army occupy the General Post Office and other buildings in Dublin before surrendering to the British Army.
- 24 April–19 May – Voyage of the James Caird, an open boat journey from Elephant Island in the South Shetland Islands to South Georgia in the southern Atlantic Ocean (800 nautical miles (1,500 km; 920 mi)) undertaken by Sir Ernest Shackleton and five companions to obtain rescue for the main body of the Imperial Trans-Antarctic Expedition (left under command of Frank Wild) following the loss of its ship Endurance.
- 25 April – German battlecruisers and Zeppelins bombard Lowestoft and Great Yarmouth.
- 27 April – Gas attack at Hulluch in France: 47th Brigade, 16th (Irish) Division, decimated in one of the most heavily concentrated gas attacks of the war.
- 29 April – Siege of Kut ends with the surrender of British Indian Army forces to the Ottoman Empire at Kut-al-Amara on the Tigris in Basra Vilayet during the Mesopotamian campaign.
- 2 May – eight German Zeppelins raid the east coast of England.
- 16 May – the UK and France conclude the secret Sykes–Picot Agreement, which is to divide Arab areas of the Ottoman Empire, following the conclusion of the war, into French and British spheres of influence.
- 21 May – daylight saving time introduced.
- 31 May–1 June – Battle of Jutland between the Royal Navy's Grand Fleet and the German High Seas Fleet in the North Sea, World War I's only large-scale clash of battleships. The result is tactically inconclusive but British dominance of the North Sea is maintained. Prince Albert is present as an officer.
- 5 June – HMS Hampshire sinks having hit a mine off Orkney with Lord Kitchener aboard. 737 lives, including Kitchener, were lost.
- 12 June – Whit Monday bank holiday abandoned (rescheduled to 8 August but subsequently abandoned altogether).

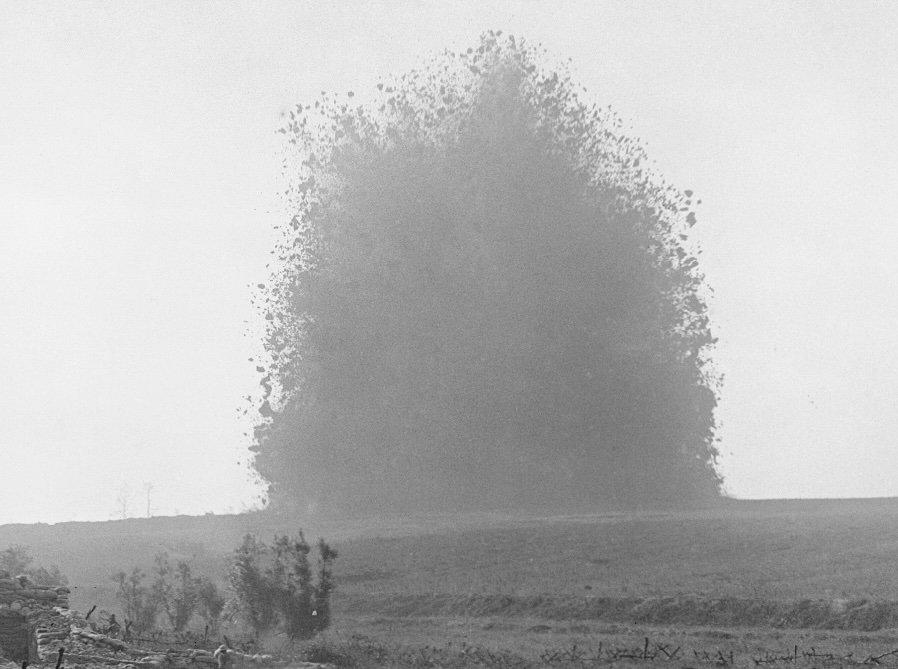
First day on the Somme opens

- 1 July–18 November – Battle of the Somme: More than one million soldiers die; with 57,470 British Empire casualties on the first day, 19,240 of them killed, the British Army's bloodiest day; the Accrington Pals battalion is effectively wiped out in the first few minutes. The immediate result is tactically inconclusive.
- 25 July – North of Scotland Special Military Area declared, restricting access by non-residents to everywhere north of the Great Glen. Other areas so designated this year are the Isle of Sheppey (7 September), Newhaven (22 September), Harwich (27 September), Dover (6 October) and Spurn.
- 27 July – English civilian ferry captain Charles Fryatt is executed at Bruges after a German court-martial condemns him for attempting to ram a U-boat in 1915.
- 3 August – the musical comedy Chu Chin Chow, written, produced, directed and starring Oscar Asche, with music by Frederic Norton, premières at His Majesty's Theatre in London. It will run for five years and a total of 2,238 performances (more than twice as many as any previous musical), a record that will stand for nearly forty years.
- 7 August – August bank holiday abandoned.
- 10 August – the official documentary propaganda film The Battle of the Somme is premièred in London. In the first six weeks of general release (from 20 August) 20 million people view it.
- 21–24 August – Low Moor Explosion: A series of explosions at a munitions factory in Bradford kills 40 people and injures over 100.
- 2 September – William Leefe-Robinson becomes the first pilot to shoot down a German airship over Britain.

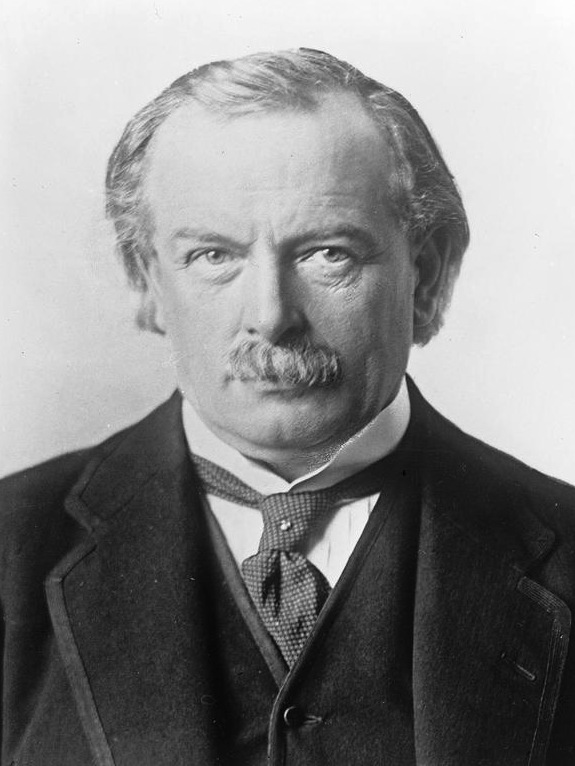
Lloyd George in 1916

- 15–22 September – Battle of Flers–Courcelette in France: British advance. The battle is significant for the first use of the tank in warfare. The Prime Minister's son, Raymond Asquith, is killed in action.
- 24 September – following a bombing raid on east London, German Zeppelin LZ76 carrying military number L 33 makes a forced landing at Little Wigborough in Essex; its crew are the only armed enemy personnel to set foot in England during the War.
- 6 October – a British Army Order removes the requirement for soldiers to wear moustaches.
- 26–27 October – first Battle of Dover Strait: German torpedo boats attack the Dover Barrage.
- 27 October – life-boat William and Emma from Salcombe Lifeboat Station capsizes on service off the south Devon coast with the loss of all 13 crew.
- 21 November – hospital ship HMHS Britannic, designed as the third Olympic-class ocean liner for White Star Line, sinks in the Kea Channel of the Aegean Sea after hitting a mine. 30 lives are lost and, at 48,158 gross register tons, she is the largest ship lost during the War.
- 27 November – no. 9r is the first British rigid airship to fly (at Walney Island).
- 28 November – first bombing of central London by a fixed-wing aircraft when a German LVG C.II biplane drops 6 bombs near Victoria station.
- 1 December – the Government takes control of mines in the South Wales Coalfield; miners' wages here are increased by 15%.
- 5 December – Asquith resigns; on 6 December Lloyd George is invited to succeed him as Prime Minister, which he does on 7 December.
- 11 December – Lloyd George establishes a War Cabinet and the first Cabinet Secretary is appointed (Sir Maurice Hankey, who serves until 1938). Lord Derby succeeds Lloyd George as War Minister. The Ministry of Labour is formed.
- 22 December – the Sopwith Camel biplane fighter aircraft makes its maiden flight at Brooklands.
- 31 December – Douglas Haig promoted to Field marshal.

=== Undated ===
- The Kent village of Hampton-on-Sea is abandoned due to coastal erosion.
- Mary Hare School is founded as Dene Hollow School for the Deaf, originally in Burgess Hill.
- Gustav Holst completes composition of his orchestral suite The Planets, Opus 32.
- White-tailed sea eagle last breeds in the UK, on Skye (prior to reintroduction).

== Publications ==
- Robert Baden-Powell's The Wolf Cub's Handbook.
- John Buchan's wartime thriller Greenmantle.
- Sir Oliver Lodge's spiritualist text Raymond; or, Life and death
- Charlotte Mew's poetry The Farmer's Bride.
- Charles Hamilton Sorley's posthumous Marlborough and Other Poems.
- The first Wheels poetry anthology Wheels 1916 edited by the Sitwells.

== Births ==
- 2 January – Edmund Leopold de Rothschild, financier (died 2009)
- 3 January – Joan Ingpen, opera talent manager (died 2007)
- 6 January – Adrian Beers, double bass player (died 2004)
- 9 January – Peter Twinn, mathematician and World War II code-breaker (died 2004)
- 12 January – Mary Wilson, Baroness Wilson of Rievaulx, poet and wife of British prime minister Harold Wilson (died 2018)
- 25 January – Frederick Valentine Atkinson, mathematician (died 2002)
- 28 January – David Stanley Evans, astronomer (died 2004)
- 1 February – Jack Lyons, financier (died 2008)
- 2 February – John Bridgeman, sculptor (died 2004)
- 4 February – Gavin Ewart, poet (died 1995)
- 6 February – John Crank, physicist (died 2006)
- 13 February – John Reed, actor and opera singer (died 2010)
- 14 February
  - Sally Gray, born Constance Stevens, film actress (died 2006)
  - Dick Moore, naval officer (died 2003)
- 15 February – Ernest Millington, politician (died 2009)
- 16 February – Frank Blackmore, traffic engineer (died 2008)
- 10 March – Ethel Bush, police officer (died 2016)
- 11 March – Harold Wilson, Prime Minister of the United Kingdom (died 1995)
- 14 March – Patricia Hilliard, actress (died 2001)
- 17 March – Ray Ellington, singer (died 1985)
- 19 March – Eric Christmas, actor (died 2000)
- 29 March
  - Sam Beazley, actor (died 2017)
  - John Paul, colonial administrator (died 2004)
- 2 April – John Saville, Marxist historian (died 2009)
- 9 April – John Pinches, rower and soldier (died 2007)
- 11 April – David Smiley, Army officer (died 2009)
- 19 April
  - William Moore, actor (died 2000)
  - Peter Youens, diplomat (died 2000)
- 28 April – Bill Bland, optician and communist (died 2001)
- 7 May – Huw Wheldon, broadcaster (died 1986)
- 16 May – Margaret Ursula Jones, archaeologist (died 2001)
- 20 May – Owen Chadwick, religious historian (died 2015)
- 22 May – Rupert Davies, television actor (died 1976)
- 25 May – Ewart Oakeshott, illustrator (died 2002)
- 29 May – Arthur Seldon, economist (died 2005)
- 31 May
  - Judy Campbell, actress (died 2004)
  - Bernard Lewis, historian (died 2018)
- 3 June – Leslie Grade, born Laszlo Winogradsky, theatrical talent agent (died 1979)
- 4 June
  - Cecil Blacker, army general (died 2002)
  - Doreen Evans, racing driver (died 1982)
- 8 June – Francis Crick, molecular biologist, recipient of the Nobel Prize in Physiology or Medicine (died 2004)
- 10 June – Bill Waddington, actor and comedian (died 2000)
- 13 June – Ronald Atkins, Welsh politician (died 2020)
- 15 June – Stephen Terrell, barrister and politician (died 2004)
- 20 June – Johnny Morris, television presenter (died 1999)
- 23 June – Len Hutton, cricketer (died 1990)
- 28 June
  - John Anderson, Army officer (died 2007)
  - Richard Best, film editor (died 2004)
  - Stewart Farrar, screenwriter, novelist and Wiccan priest (died 2000)
- 1 July – Olivia de Havilland, Tokyo-born film actress (died 2020 in France)
- 9 July – Edward Heath, Prime Minister of the United Kingdom (died 2005)
- 11 July – Reg Varney, actor (died 2008)
- 15 July
  - A. A. Englander, television cinematographer (died 2004)
  - Dorothy Mackie Low, novelist (died 2002)
- 20 July – Mary Barclay, actress (died 2008)
- 21 July – Douglas Freeman, cricketer (died 2013)
- 29 July – Max Faulkner, golfer (died 2005)
- 30 July – Dick Wilson, British-born American actor (died 2007)
- 31 July – Brenda Rawnsley, arts campaigner (died 2007)
- 1 August – Edna Hughes, Olympic swimmer (died 1990)
- 5 August – Arthur Wheeler, motorcyclist (died 2001)
- 6 August – Richard Buckle, ballet critic (died 2001)
- 18 August – Moura Lympany, born Mary Johnstone, classical pianist (died 2005)
- 19 August – Dennis Poore, entrepreneur, financier and racing driver (died 1987)
- 20 August – Bernard Archard, actor (died 2008)
- 21 August – Geoffrey Keen, actor (died 2005)
- 24 August – John Albert Axel Gibson, World War II air ace (died 2000)
- 30 August
  - Kenneth Keith, Baron Keith of Castleacre, businessman and life peer (died 2004)
  - John Thoday, geneticist (died 2008)
- 31 August – Robert Hanbury Brown, astronomer (died 2002)
- 12 September – William Woodruff, historian (died 2008)
- 13 September – Roald Dahl, author (died 1990)
- 14 September
  - Eric Bentley, English-born American theatre critic and playwright (died 2020)
  - Cledwyn Hughes, politician (died 2001)
- 16 September – Don Ryder, businessman and politician (died 2003)
- 17 September – Mary Stewart, born Mary Rainbow, romantic suspense novelist (died 2014)
- 18 September – Frank Bell, educator (died 1989)
- 19 September – Giles Romilly, journalist (died 1967)
- 26 September – Denis Spotswood, RAF air marshal (died 2001)
- 29 September – Carl Giles, cartoonist (died 1995)
- 3 October
  - Peter Cundy, World War II pilot (died 2005)
  - James Herriot, born James Alfred Wight, veterinarian and author (died 1995)
  - Frank Pantridge, cardiologist (died 2004)
- 7 October – Sir Hereward Wake, 14th Baronet, army officer (died 2017)
- 10 October – Gerald Davis, philatelist (died 2005)
- 17 October – Robert S. Baker, television producer (died 2009)
- 19 October – Michael Pollock, admiral (died 2006)
- 5 November – Len Wilkinson, cricketer (died 2002)
- 6 November – Harry Blamires, Anglican theologian, literary critic and novelist (died 2017)
- 11 November
  - Robert Carr, politician (died 2012)
  - Katharina Dalton, physicist (died 2004)
- 17 November – Rodney Hilton, historian (died 2002)
- 23 November – Allan Gilmour, Army colonel (died 2003)
- 24 November – James Pope-Hennessy, biographer and travel writer (murdered 1974)
- 28 November – Lilian, Princess of Réthy, born Mary Lilian Baels, English-born Belgian royal consort (died 2002 in Belgium)
- 29 November – Helen Clare, singer (died 2018)
- 2 December – John Bentley, actor (died 2009)
- 4 December – Harold Fielding, theatre producer (died 2003)
- 6 December – Derek Hill, painter (died 2000)
- 9 December
  - I. J. Good, mathematician and cryptologist (died 2009)
  - James Brian Tait, RAF pilot (died 2007)
- 17 December – Penelope Fitzgerald, born Penelope Knox, poet, essayist and biographer (died 2000)
- 19 December
  - Jack Agazarian, World War II spy (executed 1945)
  - Roy Baker, film director (died 2010)
- 20 December – Tom Chantrell, illustrator (died 2001)
- 23 December – Robert Blake, historian (died 2003)
- 24 December – Ron G. Mason, oceanographer (died 2009)
- 25 December
  - Noel Annan, military intelligence officer, historian and academic (died 2000)
  - John McManners, clergyman and historian (died 2006)
- 26 December – Douglas Hugh Everett, chemist (died 2002)

== Deaths ==
- 30 January – Sir Clements Markham, geographer, explorer and writer (born 1830)
- 14 February – Reginald Alexander, physician (born 1847)
- 23 February – Jabez Balfour, businessman, politician and fraudster (born 1843)
- 28 February – Henry James, novelist (born 1843 in the United States)
- 11 March – Florence Baker, explorer (born 1841 in Hungary)
- 31 May – Sir Horace Hood, admiral (killed in action) (born 1870)
- 5 June – Herbert Kitchener, 1st Earl Kitchener, field marshal, diplomat and statesman (drowned) (born 1850)
- 12 June – Silvanus P. Thompson, electrical engineer and science educator (born 1851)
- 1 July – First Day on the Somme (killed in action)
  - W. N. Hodgson (Edward Melbourne), war poet (born 1893)
  - Charles Bertie Prowse, Brigadier-General (born 1869)
  - Gilbert Waterhouse, architect and war poet (born 1883)
- 10 July – Robert Bickersteth, politician (born 1847)
- 23 July – Sir William Ramsay, chemist, Nobel Prize laureate (born 1852)
- 27 July – Charles Fryatt, mariner (executed) (born 1872)
- 29 July – Eleanor Vere Boyle, watercolourist and illustrator (born 1825)
- 3 August – Roger Casement, Irish nationalist (executed) (born 1864)
- 5 August – George Butterworth, composer (killed in action) (born 1885)
- 28 September – Richard Thomas, tin plate manufacturer (born 1837)
- 14 November – Saki, short-story writer (killed on active service) (born 1870)
- 22 November – Sir George White, 1st Baronet, businessman (born 1854)
- 23 November
  - Charles Booth, shipowner and social reformer (born 1840)
  - Lanoe Hawker, fighter pilot (killed in action) (born 1890)
- 5 December – Augusta of Cambridge, member of the royal family (born 1822)

== See also ==
- List of British films before 1920
