= United Irish Uprising in Newfoundland =

Irish Catholic uprising in Newfoundland

- Part of Atlantic Revolutions
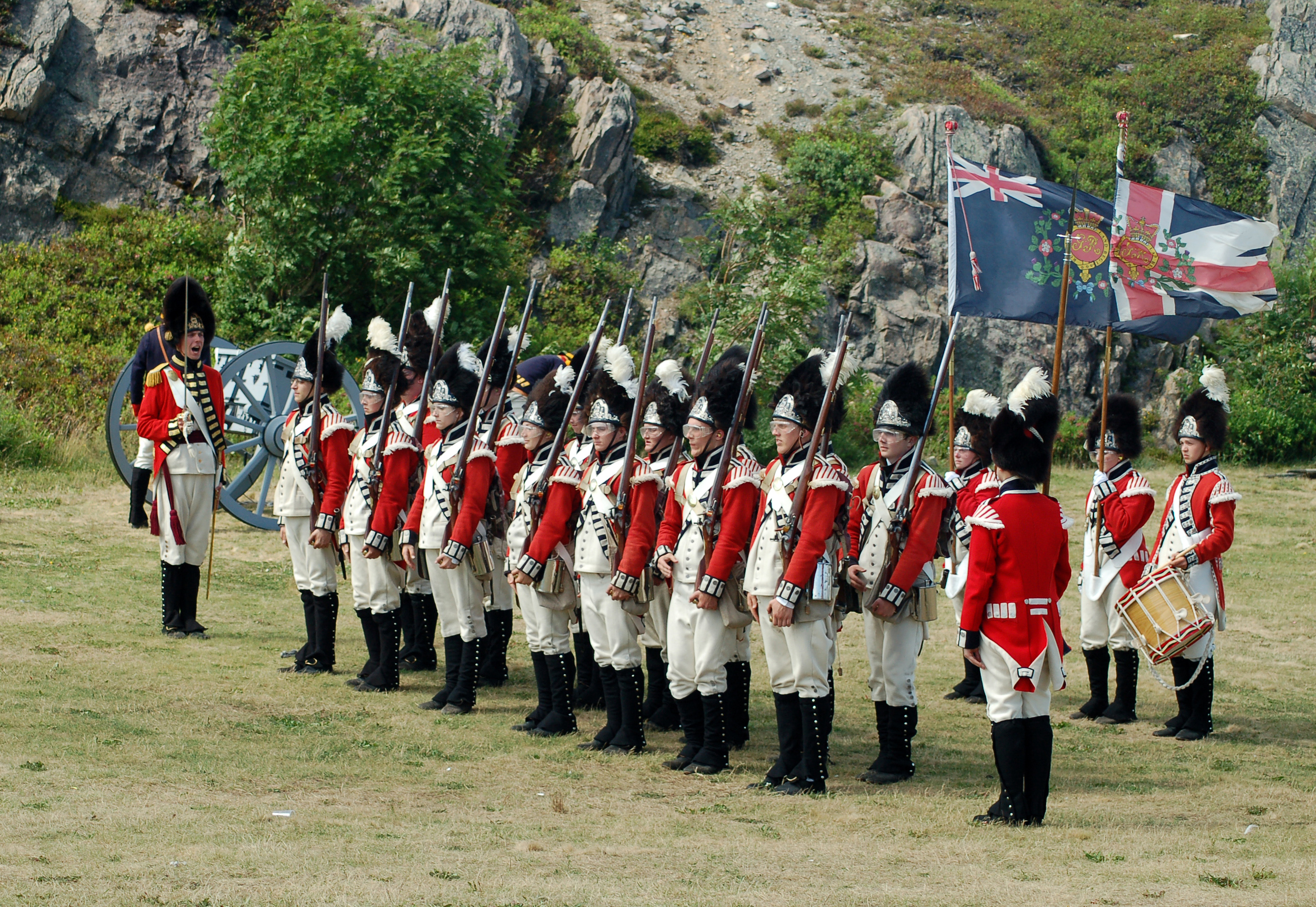
- Reenactors portraying the Royal Newfoundland Regiment, a unit involved in the uprising
Date	24 April 1800
Location	St. John's, Newfoundland Colony
Result	British victory: Mutiny suppressed

Belligerents
Great Britain	Mutineers

Commanders and leaders
Duke of Kent; John Skerrett	James Murphy; Sergeant Kelly

Strength
British garrison in Newfoundland	19 mutineers

Casualties and losses
None	8 executed 5 transported

The United Irish Uprising in Newfoundland was a failed mutiny by Irish soldiers in the British garrison in St. John's, Newfoundland on 24 April 1800. The authorities attributed it to the influence and example of the United Irishmen and their rebellion in Ireland two years prior.

== Background ==
In 1798, a failed rebellion against British rule in Ireland occurred. A large-scale migration of Irish immigrants to Newfoundland was occurring concurrently, which increased after the rebellion; by 1800, two-thirds of the population of St. John's, and many in the British garrison, were Irish. In April 1800, rumors began to spread in St. John's that as many as 400 Irish people, including soldiers in the Newfoundland garrison (which included the Royal Newfoundland Regiment, the Royal Newfoundland Fencibles and the Royal Artillery) inspired by the Society of United Irishmen had formed a secret society and taken oaths to organize a mutiny. More than 80 Irish soldiers were believed to have planned to rendezvous at the gunpowder magazine of Fort Townshend, before fragging their officers and murdering several leading townspeople on April 20.

== Uprising ==
Responding to these rumors, John Skerrett, the highest-ranking officer in the garrison, ordered the Royal Newfoundland Fencibles to be placed on parade on April 20. On the night of April 24, 19 Irish soldiers (consisting of 11 fencibles and twelve artillerymen led by James Murphy and Sergeant Kelly) gathered at the Fort Townshend gunpowder magazine, where they discovered that 30 fellow mutineers from Fort William were unable to join them (their commander, Thomas Skinner, had ordered them to be temporarily detained in response to the rumors). Word of the attempted mutiny quickly spread, and the 19 mutineers fled into the countryside.

Fr. James Louis O’Donel, the Catholic Bishop of St. John’s, having got wind of what was afoot, had enjoined his missioners to "oppose with all the means in their power all plotters conspirators, and favourers of the infidel French", cautioning that "the aim of this conspiracy is to dissolve all bonds, all laws by which society is held together".

== Motivation ==
To this date, no clear reason has been established for the mutiny. Local historian John FitzGerald writes:

The leaders' purpose, or what they hoped to achieve by their insurrection, has never been made clear. Whether they could even be proven definitively to be sworn United Irishmen is also unclear. Bishop O'Donel, who denied allegations that the Sunday plot included assassination at church, thought plunder and escape to America were the objectives. A much more likely explanation, suggested by others, was that the St. John's rising was less of a United Irish rebellion than it was simply an act of working class desperation to escape grim economic conditions and officer tyranny, which had required many of the Irish reserve soldiers to remain on duty instead of engaging in the fishery, by which they derived support for their families in St. John's.

While the abortive mutiny may well have been an act of desperation in the face of brutal living conditions and officer tyranny, many of the Newfoundland Irish would have been aware of the agitation in the homeland for civil equality and political rights. There were reports of communication with United men in Ireland from before '98 rebellion; of Thomas Paine's pamphlets circulating in St. John's; and, despite the war with France, of hundreds of young County Waterford men still making a seasonal migration to the island for the fisheries, among them defeated rebels, said to have "added fuel to the fire" of local grievance.

== Suppression and aftermath ==
The alleged leaders of the plot were captured in a manner of weeks by soldiers from the garrison, except for Murphy and Kelly, who were never caught. Four mutineers who testified against their fellow mutineers were not court-martialed and released, while Skerrett ordered five mutineers to be executed by hanging near the gunpowder magazine. The remaining eight mutineers were sent to Halifax, Nova Scotia, where the Duke of Kent sentenced three (Garrett Fitzgerald, Edward Power and James Ivory) to be executed and the remaining five to penal transportation. According to historian John Edward FitzGerald, "The United Irish Rising in the St. John's garrison had several implications for the Irish in Newfoundland, and for British governance of its lucrative fishing colony. The Newfoundland rebellion was, as far as is known, the only one to occur which the British administration linked directly to the rebellion in Ireland. The uprising in St. John's was significant in that it was the first occasion on which the Irish in Newfoundland deliberately flouted the authority of the state, and because Britain feared that it might not be the last. It earned for Newfoundland, in the minds of British officials in the Colonial Office, a reputation as a "Transatlantic Tipperary", a far-flung but semi-Irish colony with the potential for political turbulence."

== See also ==
- List of Irish uprisings
- Fenian Raids
