= Hereford Crematorium =

Public crematorium in Hereford, England

Hereford Cemetery and Crematorium is the municipal burial ground and crematorium for the city of Hereford, England, and its surrounding area. It is located on the south side of Westfaling Street west of the city centre.

The cemetery was the first of four designed by William Henry Knight, including Great Malvern Cemetery (1861), Bouncer's Lane Cemetery, Cheltenham (1862), and Shipston-on-Stour Cemetery (1863). All of them have chapels and other features similar to those at Hereford Cemetery.

== History ==
Until 1791 all burials in Hereford took place within the precincts of Hereford Cathedral. After that date the four parishes in the city were required to make their own provision for burials. By 1853 there were 11 cemeteries in the city (seven associated with the Church of England and four with dissenting parishes) as well as small burial sites at several hospitals. In 1849 a company was created to establish a general cemetery for the city and its neighbourhood but disagreements with the Bishop of Hereford meant that by 1853 this general cemetery had not been created.

By 1876 Hereford burials were taking place at Hereford Cemetery.

In 1939 the addition of a crematorium was discussed at a council meeting but was reported as “not likely to be considered for some time”. A foundation stone was finally laid for a crematorium at Hereford Cemetery in 1955.

Hereford Cemetery contains the war graves of 91 Commonwealth service personnel, 35 from the First World War and 56 from the Second World War, as well as four Polish servicemen from the latter war.

== Notable interments/cremations ==
- There is a joint grave of five girls who died as result of the Garrick Theatre fire in 1916.
- George Robertson Sinclair (1863-1917), organist of Hereford Cathedral and friend of Edward Elgar.
- Lady Margaret Illingworth (1900-1986), widow of Albert Illingworth, 1st Baron Illingworth and victim of massive fraud committed before her death by her niece that was discovered in investigation of the murder of Simon Dale, the latter's ex-husband. (Cremated)

== Present day ==
The cemetery and crematorium are owned and operated by Herefordshire Council. The Crematorium operates year-round and has a chapel that can accommodate up to 120 people.
