= John Vaughan Campbell =

Recipient of the Victoria Cross

Brigadier-General John Vaughan Campbell VC CMG DSO
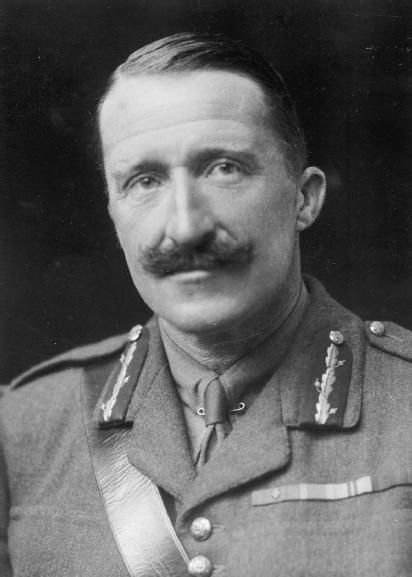
- Campbell in c. 1917–1918
- Born: 31 October 1876; London, England
- Died: 21 May 1944 (aged 67); Woodchester, Gloucestershire, England
- Military career
- Allegiance: United Kingdom
- Branch: British Army
- Service years: 1896–1933; 1939–1944
- Rank: Brigadier-General
- Units: Coldstream Guards
- Commands: 8th Battalion Gloucestershire Home Guard; 3rd Battalion, Coldstream Guards
- Conflicts: Second Boer War; First World War; Second World War
- Awards: Victoria Cross; Companion of the Order of St Michael and St George; Distinguished Service Order; Mentioned in Despatches; Officer of the Legion of Honour (France); Croix de guerre (France)

Brigadier-General John Vaughan Campbell, VC, CMG, DSO (31 October 1876 – 21 May 1944) was a senior British Army officer and a recipient of the Victoria Cross, the highest award for gallantry in the face of the enemy that can be awarded to British and Commonwealth forces.

== Early life ==
Campbell was born in London. His father, Ronald George Elidor Campbell (1848–1879), was the second son of the 2nd Earl Cawdor and an army captain, was killed at the Battle of Hlobane in the Zulu War in 1879.

He was educated at Eton College and the Royal Military College, Sandhurst, before entering the Coldstream Guards in 1896. He served through the Second Boer War, in which he was awarded the Distinguished Service Order (DSO) and twice mentioned in despatches.

== First World War ==
Campbell was 39 years old, and a temporary lieutenant colonel commanding the 3rd Battalion, Coldstream Guards during the First World War when the following deed took place for which he was awarded the VC.

On 15 September 1916 at Ginchy, France, during the Battle of the Somme, Lieutenant Colonel Campbell took personal command of the third line when the first two waves of his battalion had been decimated by machine-gun and rifle fire. He rallied his men and led them against the enemy machine-guns, capturing the guns and killing the personnel. Later in the day he again rallied the survivors of his battalion and led them through very heavy hostile fire. His "personal gallantry and initiative at a very critical moment" enabled the division to press on and capture objectives of the highest tactical importance.

Not mentioned in the citation but much reported in the popular press, by which he was dubbed the "Tally-Ho VC", is that he rallied his men under fire by blowing a hunting horn and giving the traditional hunting cry.

Later in November 1916, he achieved the temporary rank of brigadier general when he succeeded Major General Hugh Bruce Williams in command of the 46th (North Midland) Division's 137th (Staffordshire) Infantry Brigade.

== Later life ==
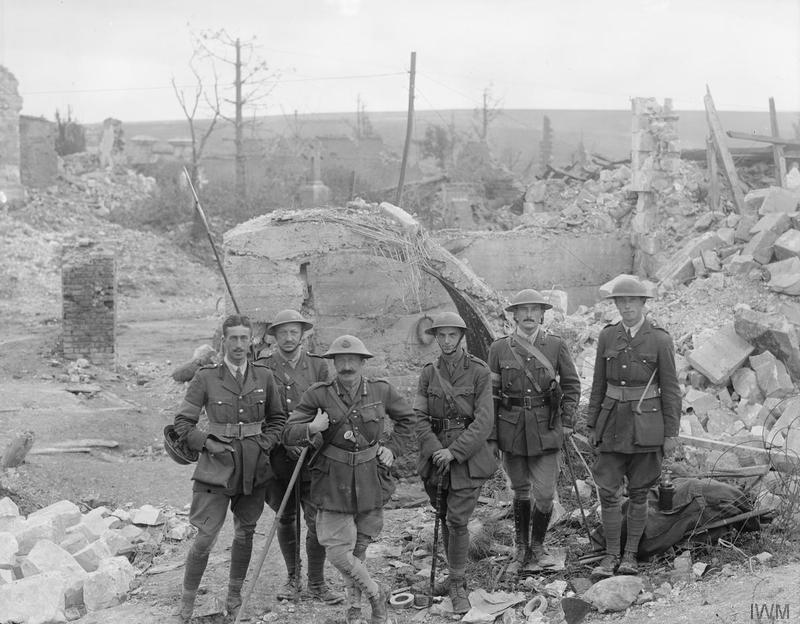
Brigadier General John Vaughan Campbell and members of his staff in the Hindenburg Line at Bellenglise, France, October 1918.

In 1919 he was appointed aide-de-camp to King George V. He was promoted to substantive colonel on 30 June 1920

He retired from the army with the honorary rank of brigadier general on 31 October 1933, and was subsequently a member of the Honourable Corps of Gentlemen at Arms until his death.

In the Second World War he was an honorary flight lieutenant in the Royal Air Force Volunteer Reserve from 1939 to 1940, then from 1941 until his death commanded the 8th Battalion Gloucestershire Home Guard. He died, aged sixty-seven, at his last home in Woodchester near Stroud, on 21 May 1944, and was cremated at Cheltenham Crematorium.

His Victoria Cross is displayed at The Guards Regimental Headquarters (Coldstream Guards RHQ) in Wellington Barracks, London.
