= James Forbes-Robertson =

Recipient of the Victoria Cross

Colonel James Forbes-Robertson VC DSO* MC DL
- Born: 7 July 1884; Brighouse, West Yorkshire
- Died: 5 August 1955 (aged 71); Bourton-on-the-Water, Gloucestershire
- Burial place: Cheltenham Cemetery
- Military career
- Allegiance: United Kingdom
- Branch: British Army
- Service years: 1904–1934
- Rank: Colonel
- Commands: 152nd Infantry Brigade; 2nd Battalion, Gordon Highlanders; 5th Battalion, Border Regiment; 87th Brigade; 1st Battalion, Border Regiment; 1st Battalion, Royal Newfoundland Regiment
- Conflicts: First World War
- Awards: Victoria Cross; Distinguished Service Order & Bar; Military Cross; Mentioned in Despatches (3)

Colonel James Forbes-Robertson VC, DSO & Bar, MC, DL (7 July 1884 – 5 August 1955) was a British Army officer and recipient of the Victoria Cross, the highest award for gallantry in the face of the enemy that can be awarded to British and Commonwealth forces.

Forbes-Robertson was born in 1884, at Slead Hall, a Grade II listed Building, in Brighouse, West Yorkshire and was educated at Cheltenham College.

During the First World War, he served as a staff captain in November 1915. He was the Deputy Commanding Officer of the 1st Battalion, Royal Newfoundland Regiment and as the unit's Acting Commanding Officer during the Battle of Monchy-le-Preux in April 1917. When he was 33 years old, and an acting lieutenant colonel in the 1st Battalion, The Border Regiment, during the First World War at the Battle of Estaires, he was awarded the Victoria Cross for his actions on 11/12 April 1918 near Vieux-Berquin, France: Four times Lieutenant Colonel Forbes-Robertson saved the line from breaking and averted a most serious situation. On one occasion, having made a reconnaissance on horseback in full view of the enemy under heavy fire, he led a counter-attack which was completely successful in establishing our line. When his horse was shot under him he continued on foot, steadying the men and inspiring confidence by his disregard for personal danger. On the second day he lost another horse and again continued on foot until he had established a line to which his own troops could withdraw.

On 19 May 1918, he assumed command of the 155th (South Scottish) Brigade, 52nd (Lowland) Division vice Brig.-Gen. P. S. Allan, D.S.O. Promoted to the rank of brevet major on 31 May, he commanded the 155th Brigade through the breaking of the 'Siegfried' section of the Hindenburg Line on 26 August and the storming of the Drocourt-Quéant Switch in the first three days of September 1918, handing the Brigade over to Brig.-Gen. G. H. Harrison on 25 September.

He retained the temporary rank of brigadier general whilst he served as a staff officer, later reverting to his substantive rank. He transferred from the Border Regiment to the Gordon Highlanders as a lieutenant colonel on 20 December 1926 and commanded a battalion of his new regiment.

By now serving on half-pay, he was promoted to colonel on 20 December 1930, with seniority being backdated to 17 October 1925.

Forbes-Robertson died at the age od 70 in 1955 and was buried at the Bouncer's Lane Cemetery, Cheltenham.
