= Thomas de Courcy Hamilton =

Scottish recipient of the Victoria Cross

Major-General Thomas de Courcy Hamilton VC
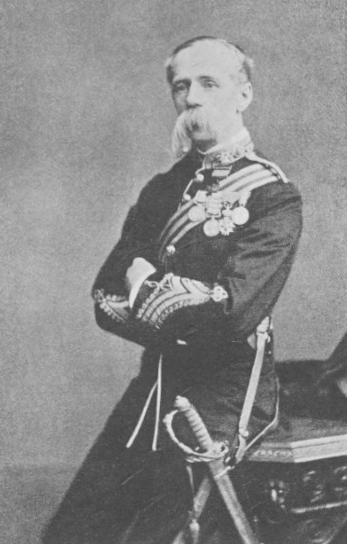
- Born: 20 July 1825; Stranraer, Scotland
- Died: 3 March 1908 (aged 82); Cheltenham, Gloucestershire, England
- Burial place: Cheltenham Cemetery
- Military career
- Allegiance: United Kingdom
- Branch: British Army
- Service years: 1842–1872
- Rank: Major-General
- Units: 90th Regiment of Foot (Perthshire Volunteers); 68th Regiment of Foot
- Commands: 64th Regiment of Foot
- Conflicts: Crimean War
- Awards: Victoria Cross

Major-General Thomas de Courcy Hamilton VC (20 July 1825 – 3 March 1908) was a Scottish recipient of the Victoria Cross, the highest and most prestigious award for gallantry in the face of the enemy that can be awarded to British and Commonwealth forces.

Joining the British Army as an ensign in the 90th Regiment of Foot (Perthshire Volunteers) in 1842, he exchanged into the 68th Regiment of Foot in 1848.

== Citation ==
Hamilton was 27 years old, and a captain in the 68th Regiment of Foot, on active service during the Crimean War at the Siege of Sebastopol, when the following deed took place, for which he was awarded the Victoria Cross:

"For having, on the night of the 11th May, 1855, during a most determined sortie, boldly charged the enemy, with a small force, from a battery of which they had obtained possession in great numbers, thereby saving the works from falling into the hands of the enemy. He was conspicuous on this occasion for his gallantry, and daring conduct."

== Later life ==
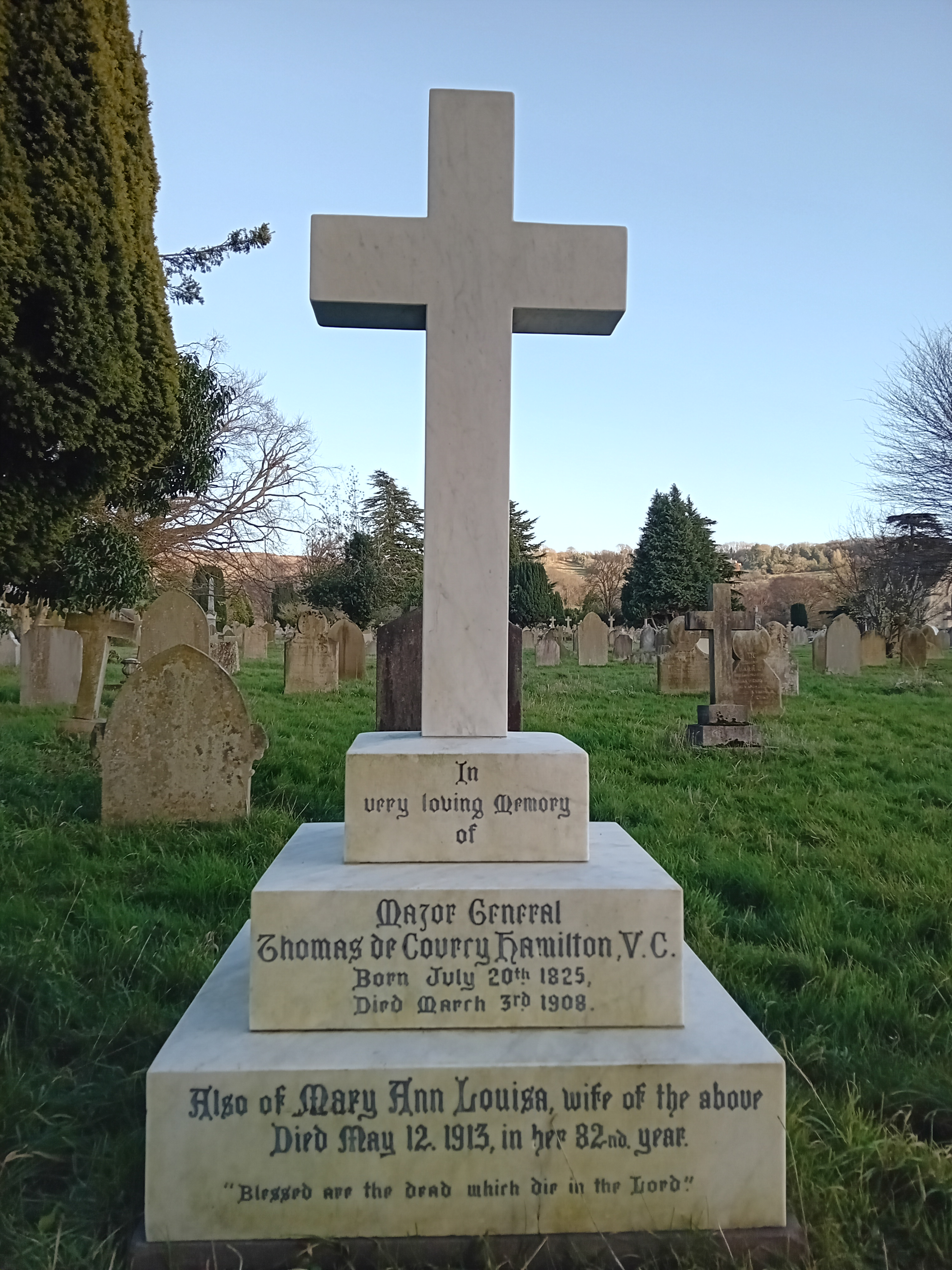
Hamilton's grave in Cheltenham Cemetery

Hamilton remained on the active list until 1872, when he was a Brevet colonel. He had a long retirement, dying in 1908, and was buried at the Bouncer's Lane Cemetery, Cheltenham, with his wife and son.

== The medal ==
The medal is held privately by descendants of Thomas de Courcy Hamilton.
