= Bouncer's Lane Cemetery, Cheltenham =

Cemetery and crematorium in England

Bouncer's Lane Cemetery
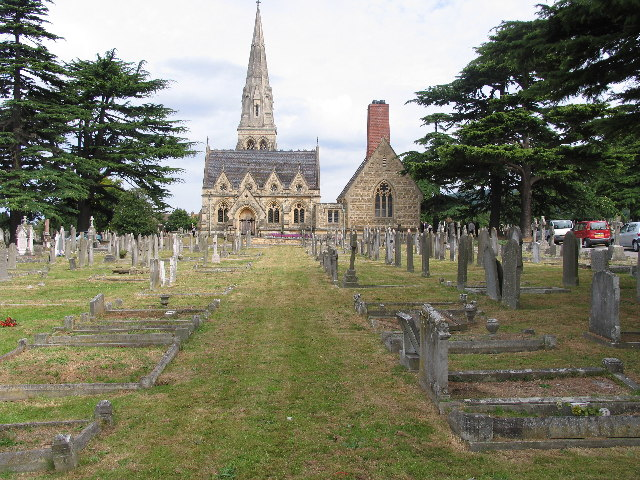
- Cemetery chapel and crematorium
- Interactive map of Bouncer's Lane Cemetery

Details
- Established: 19 November 1864; 161 years ago
- Location: Prestbury, Cheltenham, Gloucestershire
- Country: England
- Coordinates: 51.906639°N 2.042667°W
- Owned by: Cheltenham Borough Council
- Size: 70 acres (0.28 km^{2}; 0.11 sq mi)
- Website: Cemetery grounds
- Find a Grave: Bouncer's Lane Cemetery

Bouncer's Lane Cemetery, also known as Cheltenham Cemetery and Prestbury Cemetery, at Bouncer's Lane, Prestbury, Cheltenham, is a cemetery founded by the Burial Board of the Improvement Commissioners for Cheltenham. Consecrated in 1864, it remains municipal property and includes a crematorium.

The cemetery was the last of four designed by William Henry Knight, including Hereford Cemetery (1858), Great Malvern Cemetery (1861), and Shipston-on-Stour Cemetery (1863). All of them have chapels and other features similar to those at Bouncer's Lane.

== History ==
During the early 19th century, Cheltenham became fashionable as a spa, and the population grew, with many elderly and ailing people taking up residence there. As a result, there was not enough burial space, even after a new burial ground was laid out in the town in 1829–1830. In 1857 the Improvement Commissioners for Cheltenham set out to use the Burial Acts to provide a large new cemetery. They established a Burial Board, and this looked for an area of land of between twelve and twenty acres (c 5–8ha) within two miles of Cheltenham. In February 1861 land at Bouncer's Lane was bought, some from the Rev. John Edwards and some from the Poor Lands.

In July 1861 the Burial Board decided to announce a competition for the design of its new cemetery, with a prize of forty guineas for the winning design. In due course this was won by the architect W. H. Knight of Cheltenham, who proposed two Gothic chapels, joined by a porte-cochère, with a spire above it. These buildings were built between 1862 and 1864 at a cost of about £4,300, in a park with many ornamental trees and shrubs. The new cemetery was consecrated by Charles Ellicott, Bishop of Gloucester, on 19 November 1864.

In 1883 the cemetery was extended to the east and new land to the north-west was bought. Further new areas were acquired in 1926 and in the 1990s.

In 1938, a crematorium was built near the south chapel, at a time when there were only a few dozen in Great Britain. In 1995, a restoration programme for the cemetery buildings was launched.

== War graves ==
Cheltenham Cemetery contains the war graves of 110 Commonwealth service personnel of the First World War, most of whom died in local voluntary wartime hospitals. Monuments are scattered throughout the cemetery, apart from a group of ten Australian war graves. A total of 71 Commonwealth and two Polish service personnel were buried here in the Second World War, half of whom occupy a large war graves plot in the eastern section of the cemetery.

A further 29 Commonwealth servicemen and women of the Second World War were cremated at Cheltenham Crematorium and are commemorated by bronze panels erected by the Commonwealth War Graves Commission in the cloisters of the crematorium.

== As film location ==
In the 1986 film The Whistle Blower, the cemetery is the location for the interment of the central character Frank Jones' (played by Michael Caine) son Bob (Nigel Havers), who died in suspicious circumstances.

== Notable burials and cremations ==
- Brigadier-General John Vaughan Campbell V.C. (1876–1944), army officer (cremated)
- Colonel James Power Carne V.C. (1906–1986), army officer (cremated)
- Rhoda Anstey (1865–1936), suffragist, tax resister and physical education teacher in Birmingham
- William Henry Davies (1871–1940), Welsh poet who lived in Nailsworth (cremated)
- James Elroy Flecker (1884–1915), novelist and poet
- Winifred Foley (1914–2009), writer (cremated)
- Colonel James Forbes-Robertson V.C. (1884–1955), army officer
- Major General Thomas de Courcy Hamilton V.C. (1825–1908), Scottish soldier
- Major William Henry Hewitt V.C. (1884–1966), army officer (cremated)
- Brian Jones (1942–1969), member of the Rolling Stones
- Major John Simpson Knox V.C. (1828–1897), army officer
- Surgeon General William Manley V.C. (1831–1901), army officer, only man awarded both the V.C. and the Iron Cross.
- Major Richard Raymond Willis V.C. (1876–1966), army officer (cremated)
