= Old St. Mary's Church, Clonmel =

Old St. Mary's Church
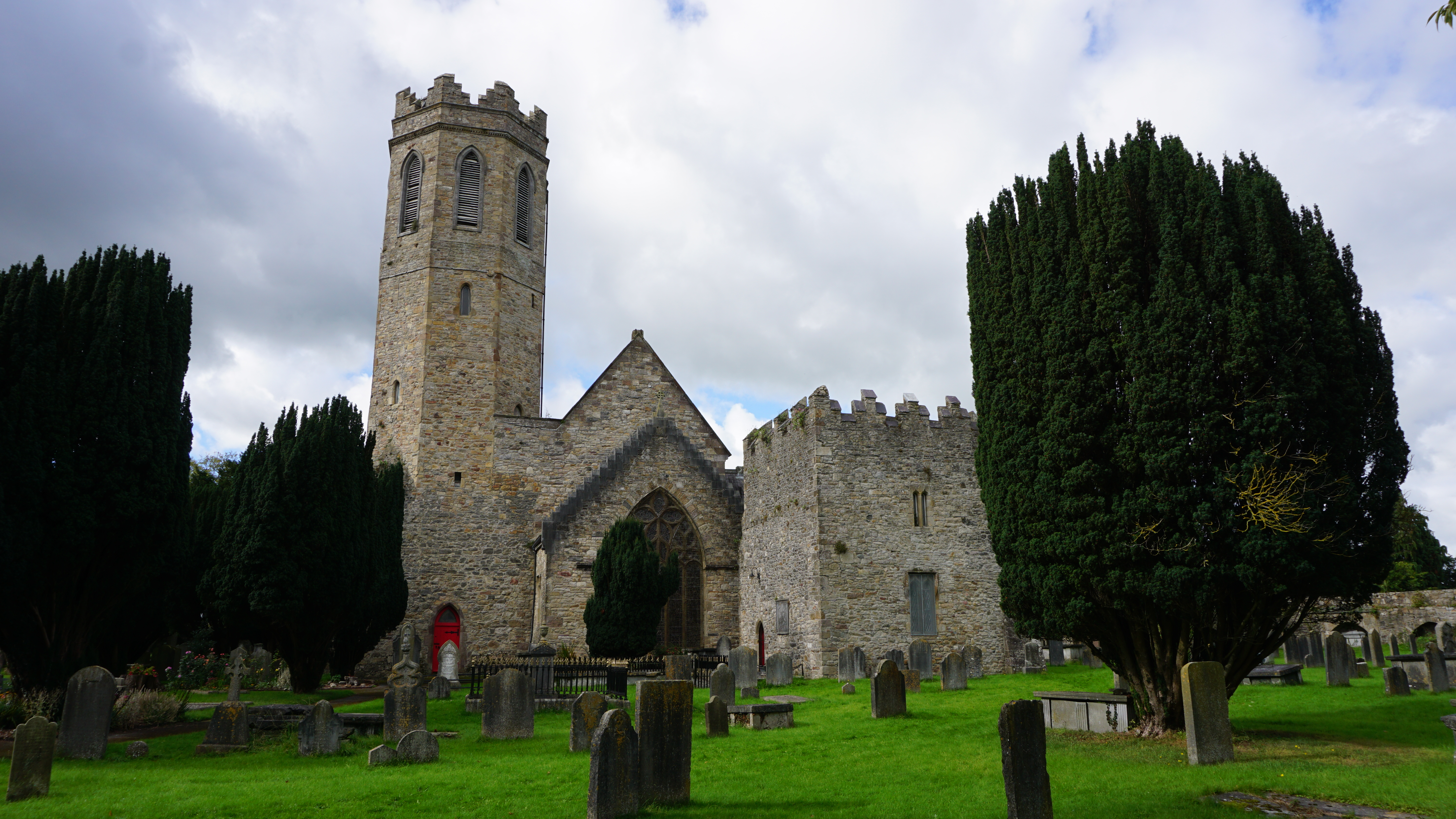
- Old St. Mary's Church
- Interactive map of the Old St. Mary's Church area

General information
- Type: Church
- Location: Clonmel, Ireland
- Completed: 1204

Technical details
- Floor area: 27ft square

Old St. Mary's Church, also known as St. Mary's Church of Ireland Church, is a medieval church in Clonmel, County Tipperary, Ireland.

It is believed to have been built in 1204 by William de Burgh, and was referenced in a letter dated August 1228.

The entire over ground 13th-century structure has disappeared, but the remains of an armored knight were found in a vault from that period, under the south aisle, in 1832. The church, as it stands today, was built and added to during the 14th, 15th and 16th centuries.

The church's main features are a 27 ft square, 84 ft high bell tower, the eastern tower house, and ornate 16th-century east and west windows.

Major renovations were undertaken on the building in 1805. The tower had, at one time, a wooden spire and belfry, which has not been restored. Crenellated parapets suggest that this was a fortified structure. Cromwell's attack on the town in the mid-17th century cost the church its tower house (today's vestry); the rest of the church was unscathed.

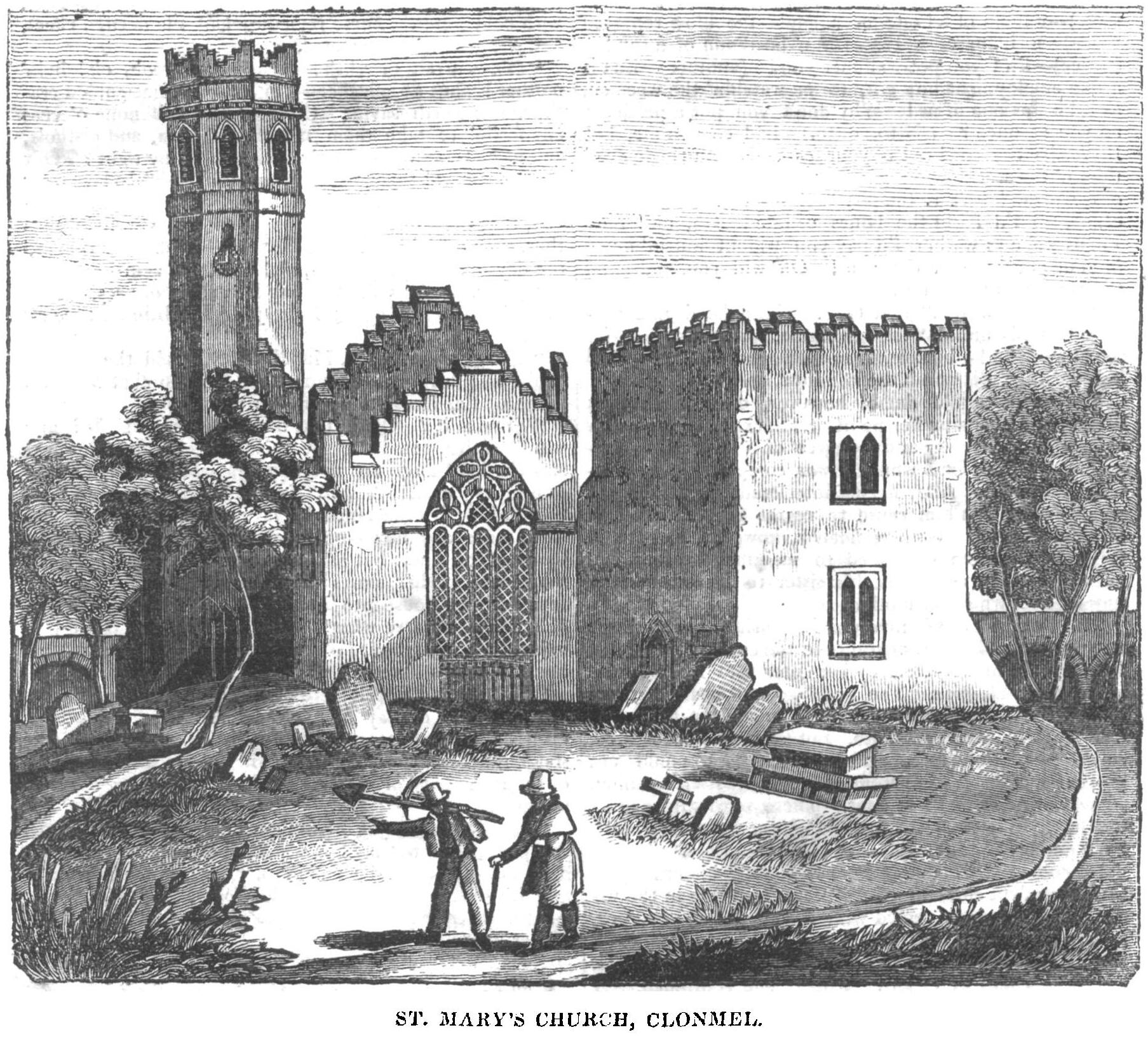
Dublin Penny Journal 1835

== Burials in the church ==
- James Louis O'Donel, first Roman Catholic bishop of St. John's, Newfoundland.
