= Thomas Skinner (British Army officer, born 1759) =

British-Newfoundland army officer

Lieutenant-Colonel Thomas Skinner (1759 – 6 February 1818) was a British military engineer born in England at Berwick-upon-Tweed. He died at Le Havre, France.

== Life ==
Skinner was born to Thomas and Hester Skinner in Berwick upon Tweed. His grandfather was Lt. Col. William Skinner who was the chief engineer in Scotland, Gibraltar and Great Britain.

Skinner came to Newfoundland in 1790 as chief engineer and spent 13 years working on fortifications and other military matters. War with France, starting in 1793, depleted the St John's garrison as they occupied the islands of Saint-Pierre and Miquelon. He recruited four companies, called the Royal Newfoundland Volunteers, to bolster the defence of St John's.

Skinner later recruited and took command of the Royal Newfoundland Fencible Regiment which was disbanded with the peace of 1802. In 1803, he left Newfoundland and retired a few years later. He must be recognized as having strengthened defences in Newfoundland under difficult circumstance, serving a number of governors who were often at variance with the military authorities.

== See also ==
- William Waldegrave, 1st Baron Radstock
