= 166th (Newfoundland) Field Artillery Regiment =

166th (Newfoundland) Heavy Artillery Regiment
- Unit insignia
- Active: April 1940 – October 1945
- Country: Dominion of Newfoundland
- Type: Field Artillery
- Size: Regiment
- Engagements: World War II: North Africa Campaign; Tunisia Campaign; Battle of Monte Cassino; Operation Grapeshot

Commanders
- Notable commanders: Lieutenant Colonel H.G. de Burgh

The 166th (Newfoundland) Field Artillery Regiment was an artillery regiment of the Dominion of Newfoundland during World War II. The regiment notably fought in North Africa Campaign and Italian Campaign as part of the Eighth Army. The regiment was disbanded in October 1945.

== History ==
=== Formation ===
Beginning in 1940, Newfoundland began recruiting citizens for what became the 57th (Newfoundland) Heavy Artillery Regiment. The first contingent of 403 volunteers arrived in Liverpool on April 25, 1940. A second contingent followed in May. After receiving training in Sussex, the regiment served in coastal defense in Norfolk. In June of 1940, the Royal Artillery formed the 59th (Newfoundland) Heavy Artillery Regiment to accommodate new volunteer recruits. Following this, in November 1941, the defensive regiment became the 166th (Newfoundland) Field Artillery Regiment and entered into training, first in England and then in Scotland. The regiment's commander was Lieutenant Colonel H.G. de Burgh who was a veteran of the First World War.

=== Deployment to North Africa ===
The regiment was sent to North Africa in December 1942 as part of the British First Army in the closing months of the North African Campaign. The regiment then served in Tunisia until the end of the campaign. In Tunisia the 166th supported soldiers of the French XIX Corps, specifically the Goumiers. During the Tunisia campaign, the regiment suffered 24 killed in action. The first fatality was Gunner J.J. Flynn of Norris Arm, who died on 7 April 1943 after an enemy shell hit his gun shelter. The regiment remained in North Africa during the invasion of Sicily, not deploying to the island until the end of the campaign.

=== Transfer to Italy ===
The regiment was sent to Italy in October 1943 with the British Eighth Army. The Regiment rotated between various divisions within the Eighth Army, including the 8th Indian Division and the 2nd New Zealand Division; the New Zealanders were under the command of Bernard Freyberg who had commanded the 88th Brigade in which the Royal Newfoundland Regiment served during the First World War. Throughout the campaign, the 166th participated in major actions such as the Battle of Monte Cassino. Captain Gordon Campbell (Cam) Eaton, was awarded the Military Cross in 1943 while serving as a forward observation officer in the regiment. The regiment remained in Italy until the end of the war, participating in the Spring 1945 offensive in Italy
