= Garrick Theatre fire =

1916 event in Hereford, England

Coordinates: 52°3.5340′N 2°42.9744′W

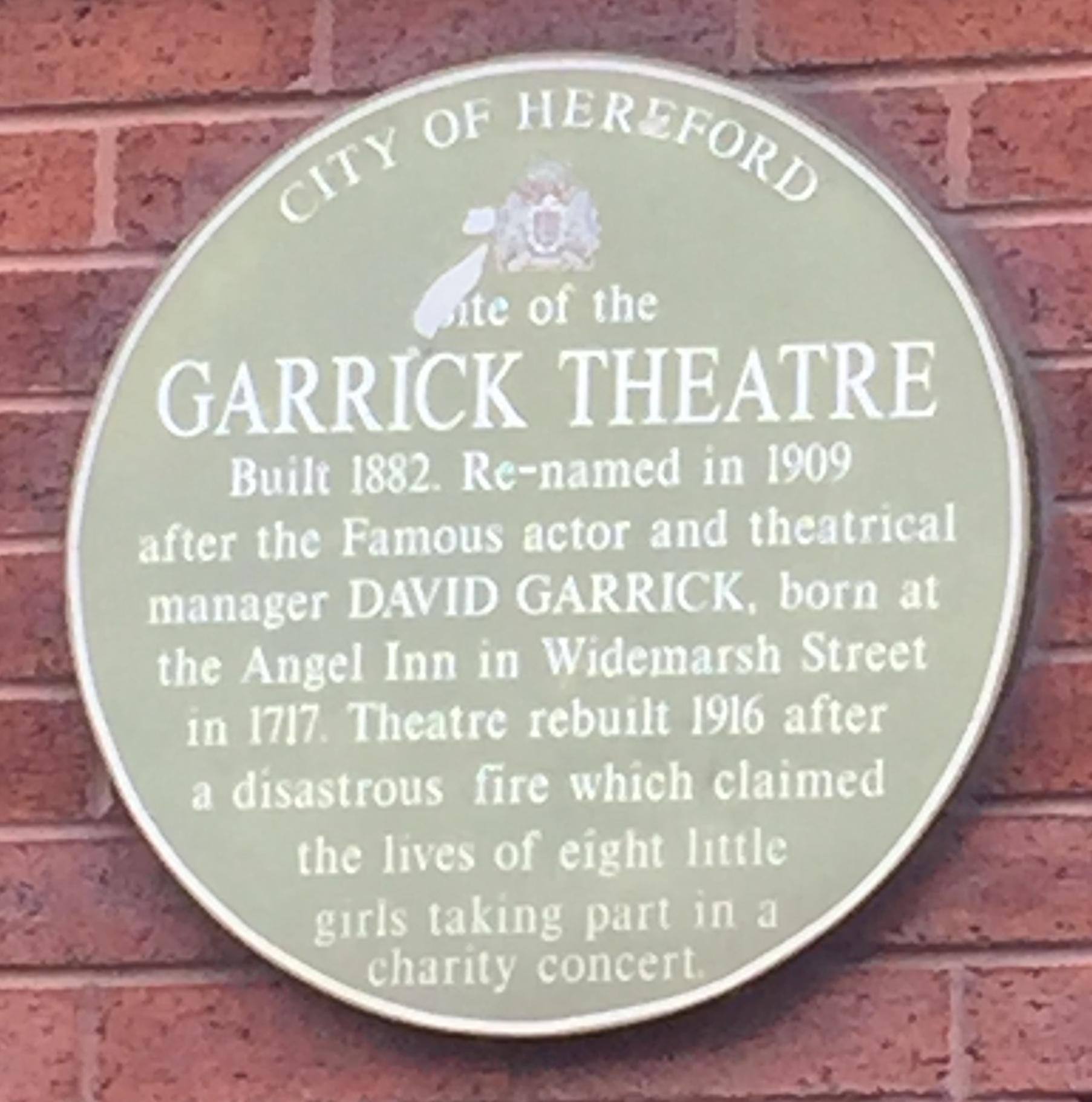
Plaque marking the site of the Garrick Theatre

In 1916, at the Garrick Theatre in Hereford, England, eight child performers were killed by a fire during a fund-raising concert. One of the group's costumes caught light when they were leaving the stage.

== Theatre ==
The theatre was built in 1882 and renamed in 1909 after David Garrick, the actor and theatrical manager, who was born in Hereford in 1717.

== Concert ==
In 1916, during World War I, a fund-raising concert was held "for the benefit of the Herefords and Shropshires" (two local county regiments, the former being the Herefordshire Regiment, the latter the King's Shropshire Light Infantry) at the Garrick Theatre, Hereford. One of the turns was provided by more than forty local school-children, wearing snow maiden and Eskimo costumes made in part from cotton wool, even though its use was prohibited in theatres, due to the risk of fire.

As a group of 13 children were leaving the stage, one of their costumes caught fire: within moments, all 13 were alight.

By the end of the night, despite rescue efforts by members of the cast and audience, six children had died. Two more died subsequently from their burns.

== Inquest ==
The subsequent inquest heard conflicting claims. Faith Mailes, the concert organiser, whose daughter died, said that she had seen a smoker, backstage, discard a match. Theatre staff and others present denied that anyone had been smoking. Verdicts of accidental death were returned.

== Funerals and legacy ==
A joint funeral for five of the victims was held at Hereford Cathedral. The public stood "ten deep" in parts of nearby Broad Street as the funeral corteges passed. Soldiers served as pall-bearers. The girls were buried at Hereford Cemetery, but the precise location of their graves is lost.

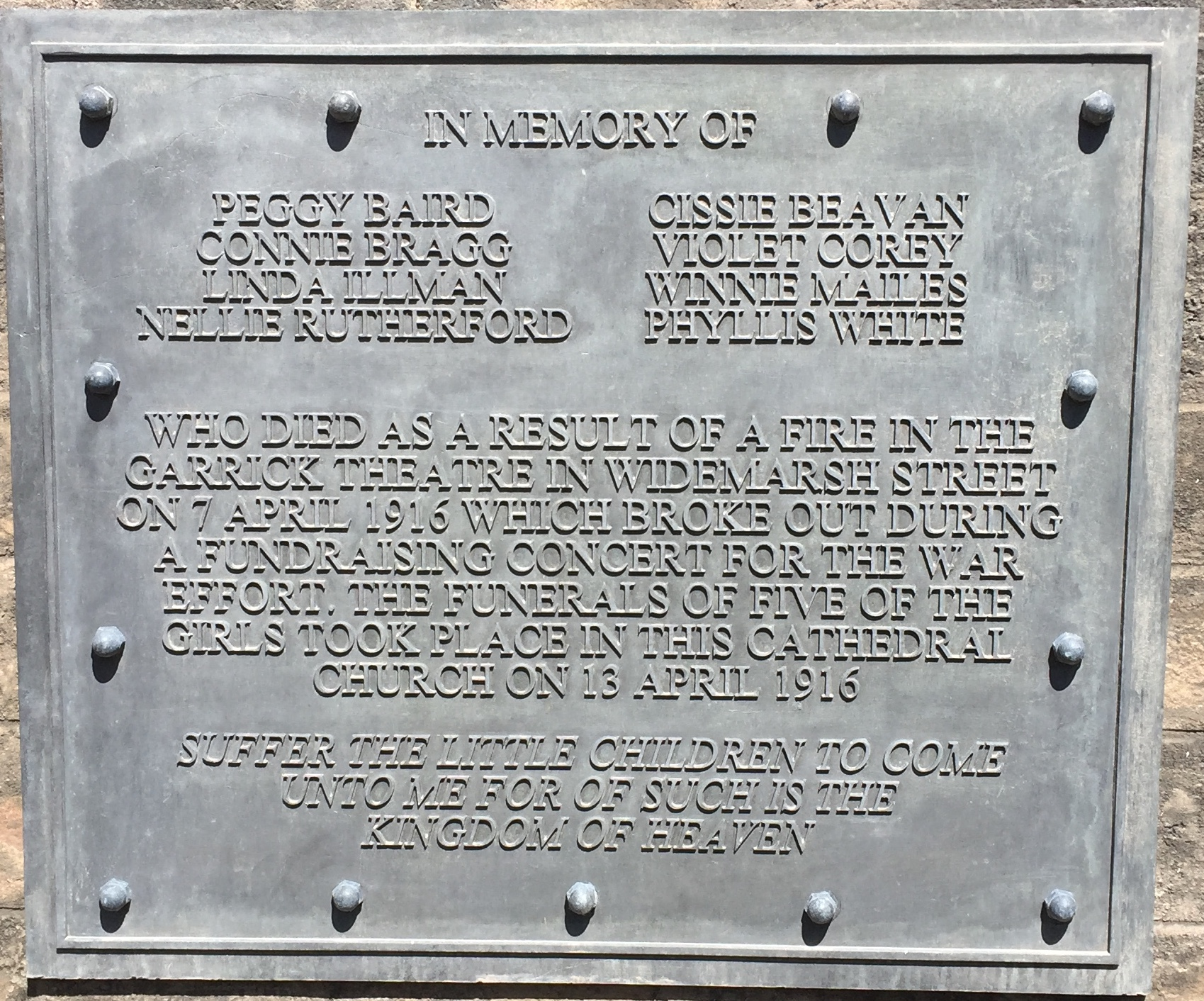
Plaque at the Lady Arbour, Hereford Cathedral dedicated to those who died in the Garrick Theatre Fire of 1916

At a meeting held in Hereford Town Hall in September 1916, it was decided to raise £500 with which to endow a memorial cot on the Children's Ward of Herefordshire General Hospital (since demolished). That target was exceeded, and the cot was unveiled there, together with a memorial plaque, in April 1917.

The theatre was rebuilt later in 1916, but subsequently demolished. Another plaque, mentioning the fire, marks its former location, on Widemarsh Street.

Local residents campaigned for a "lasting memorial" near the site. This campaign inspired Hereford Cathedral and architect Robert Kilgour to commission a memorial plaque, cast in lead. The commission was accepted by Carey Lead Ltd. and installation was carried out on 15 March 2018. The plaque is on permanent display below the SAS memorial window in the cathedral's Lady Arbour Cloister.
