= 59th (Newfoundland) Heavy Artillery Regiment =

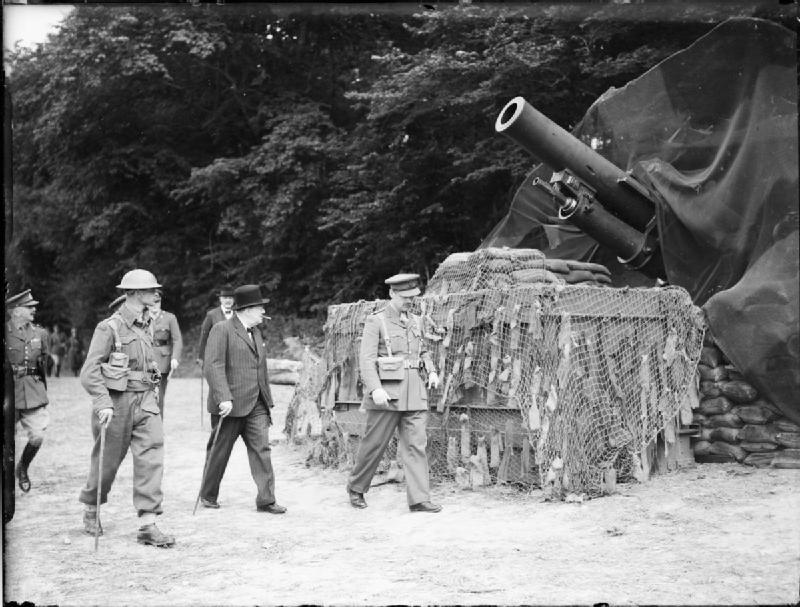
- Winston Churchill inspecting howitzers of the Regiment
- Active: June 1940 – August 1945
- Country: Dominion of Newfoundland
- Type: Heavy Artillery
- Size: Regiment
- Engagements: World War II: Battle for Caen; Falaise pocket; Operation Market Garden; Battle of the Bulge; Capture of Hamburg

Commanders
- Notable commanders: Lt. Col. J. W. Nelson

The 59th (Newfoundland) Heavy Artillery Regiment was an artillery regiment of the Dominion of Newfoundland. It was formed in June 1940 during World War II. It fought on the Western Front as part of the Army Group Royal Artillery which itself was a part of the 21st Army Group. After the war, the regiment was disbanded in August 1945 at Saffron Walden.

== History ==
=== Formation ===
The regiment was formed in June 1940 at Ifield, Crawley. It was under the command of Lt. Col. J. W. Nelson.

=== Deployment to France ===
After D-Day, the regiment was sent to France. The regiment's first action of the war in Western Europe was providing fire support for Canadian and British forces during the Battle for Caen. The regiment's 21st and 22nd Batteries targeted German positions in villages around the northern perimeter of Caen while the 155-mm guns of 20th and 23rd Batteries provided Counter-battery fire during the assault. Later, they would bombard German positions during the Battle of the Falaise Pocket.

=== Into Germany ===
During the Battle of the Bulge the four batteries of the 59th Regiment repelled the German drive to the River Meuse. On 2 May 1945, the regiment fired all of their batteries at the key Germany city of Hamburg. The next day, the city's defenders would surrender. For the next 8 weeks, the regiment helped in the administration and rerouting of refugees.
