= 51st (Highland) Division War Memorial =

51st (Highland) Division War Memorial may refer to the following memorials to the 51st (Highland) Division:

- 51st (Highland) Division War Memorial (Beaumont-Hamel), First World War memorial in the Somme
- 51st (Highland) Division War Memorial (Bréville-les-Monts), a Second World War memorial in Normandy
- 51st (Highland) Division War Memorial (Scotland), Second World War memorial in Perth
