= Ancre British Cemetery =

Cemetery in the Somme region of France

Ancre British Commonwealth War Graves Commission Cemetery
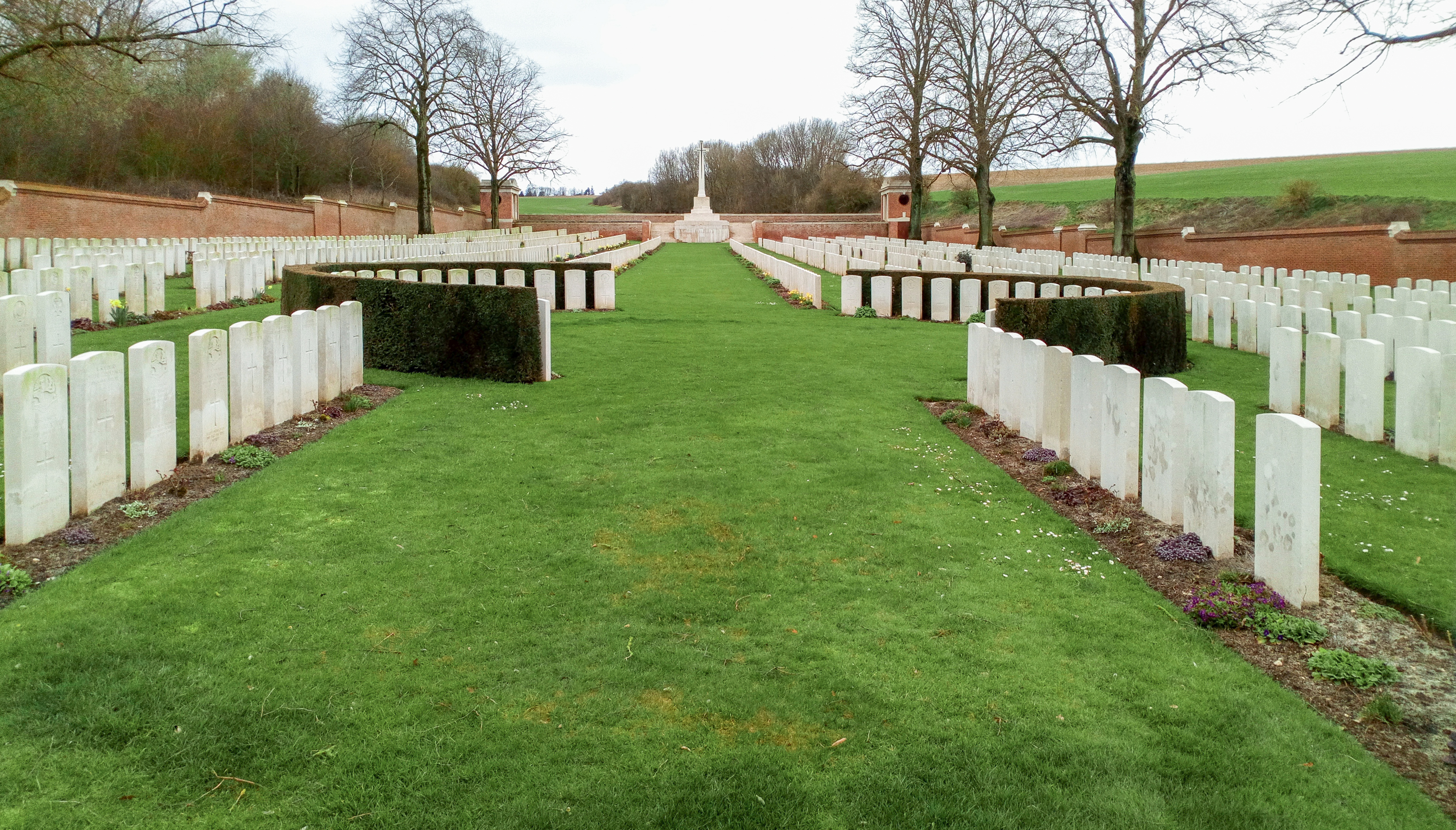
- Ancre British Cemetery
- Interactive map of Ancre British Commonwealth War Graves Commission Cemetery

Details
- Established: 1916
- Location: Somme, France
- Country: United Kingdom
- Coordinates: 50.0681°N 2.6670°E
- Type: Military
- No. of graves: 2540 total, 1335 unidentifiable
- Website: Official website
- Find a Grave: Ancre British Commonwealth War Graves Commission Cemetery
- Footnotes: Designed by Sir Reginald Blomfield

The Ancre British Cemetery is a cemetery located in the Somme region of France commemorating British and Commonwealth soldiers who fought in the Battle of the Somme in World War I. The cemetery contains mainly those who died on 1 July 1916 during the first Allied attack on the village of Beaumont-Hamel, on 3 September 1916 during the second Allied attack on the village, and on 13 November 1916 during the capture of the village and the nearby towns of Beaucourt-sur-Ancre and St. Pierre-Divion.

== Location ==
The Ancre British Cemetery is located about 2 kilometers south of Beaumont-Hamel, on the stretch of the D50 road between the villages of Albert and Achiet-le-Grand. It is located close to the Ancre River, 4.5 miles away from the town of Albert and 0.75 miles away from Beaucourt Hamel Station.

== Attacks on Beaumont-Hamel ==
=== First attack ===
The first attack on Beaumont-Hamel occurred on 1 July 1916. It was carried out by the British 29th Division, with the 4th Division holding up the left and the 36th (Ulster) holding the right. The attack failed miserably, with the British suffering over 20,000 killed and 37,000 wounded in three failed waves. In one of the regiments buried in the Ancre Cemetery, the Royal Newfoundland Regiment, only 68 men were fit to fight after the attack, with 324 killed or MIA and 368 wounded.

=== Second attack ===
The second attack on Beaumont-Hamel occurred on 3 September and was also unsuccessful.

=== Third attack and capture ===
On 13–14 November 1916 the 51st Highland, 63rd Royal Naval, 39th Western, and 19th Western Divisions finally succeeded in capturing the town.

== Establishment ==
=== History ===
The cemetery originally housed 517 men. Following the German retreat to the Hindenburg Line in spring 1917, the British V Corps cleared the battlefield and buried the dead in a number of burial sites, which were later consolidated into the Ancre British Cemetery after the end of World War I. Special memorials at the cemetery commemorate 16 soldiers whose graves were destroyed by artillery fire and 43 known casualties assumed to be buried among the unknown.

=== Former burial sites moved into Ancre ===
Former burial sites of soldiers now buried in Ancre British Cemetery include:

- Ancre River British Cemetery No.2 (V Corps Cemetery No. 27) was located about 364 metres east of the No.1 cemetery. It contained the graves of 64 officers and men from the 1st H.A.C., 11th Royal Sussex, and Hood Battalions who were killed in September and November 1916.
- Beaucourt Station Cemetery was begun after the capture of Beaucourt on 14 November 1916. It contained the graves of 85 officers and men from the United Kingdom who were killed between November 1916 and March 1917. It was located close to Beaucourt-Hamel station.
- Green Dump Cemetery was located southwest of "Station Road", the road between Beaumont-Hamel and the Beaucourt-Hamel station. It was filled between November 1916 and March, 1917 and contained the graves of 45 soldiers and one marine from the United Kingdom.
- R.N.D. Cemetery (V Corps Cemetery No. 21) was located in the open country midway between Beaumont-Hamel and Hamel. It contained the graves of 336 officers and men from the United Kingdom, mainly from the Royal Naval Division.
- Sherwood Cemetery (V Corps Cemetery No.20) was located about 637 metres northwest of the R.N.D. Cemetery. It contained the graves of 176 officers and men from the United Kingdom, primarily from the 36th and Royal Naval Divisions, 17th Sherwood Foresters and 17th King's Royal Rifles.
- Station Road Cemetery, located south of Station Road, 450 metres West of the railway, was filled from November 1916 to March, 1917. It contained 82 officers and men from the United Kingdom.
- "Y" Ravine Cemetery No.2 (V Corps Cemetery No. 18) was located about 270 metres southeast of the present day "Y" Ravine Cemetery. 140 officers and men from the United Kingdom and two from Newfoundland who fell in July, September and November, 1916 were buried here.

=== Statistics ===
Of the 2,540 men currently buried at Ancre, 1,335 were unable to be identified and 1,179 were able to be identified.

Distribution of identifiable bodies:

Identified Burials by Nationality
Nationality	Number of Burials
United Kingdom	1184
Canada	24
New Zealand	2
Germany	1
Total	1211

Identified Burials by Unit
Unit Name	Number buried	Unit Name	Number buried
Royal Naval Division	410	Royal Fusiliers – City of London Regiment	115
Honourable Artillery Company	63	Bedfordshire Regiment	58
Rifle Brigade	56	King's Royal Rifle Corps	43
Royal Inniskilling Fusiliers	40	Royal Irish Fusiliers	39
Sherwood Foresters – Notts. & Derbys Regiment	36	Royal Dublin Fusiliers	34
Hampshire Regiment	28	Royal Sussex Regiment	24
Royal Irish Rifles	22	Royal Newfoundland Regiment	22
Gordon Highlanders	21	King's Own Scottish Borderers	19
Border Regiment	16	Royal Welsh Fusiliers	16
Northumberland Fusiliers	9	Manchester Regiment	7
Royal Field Artillery	6	South Staffordshire Regiment	6
South Wales Borderers	6	West Yorkshire Regiment	6
King's Own Yorkshire Light Infantry	5	Royal Engineers	5
Dorsetshire Regiment	4	Royal Berkshire Regiment	4
Somerset Light Infantry	4	Black Watch – Royal Highlanders	3
Devonshire Regiment	3	East Yorkshire Regiment	3
Essex Regiment	3	Lancashire Fusiliers	3
Royal Warwickshire Regiment	3	Cheshire Regiment	2
East Lancashire Regiment	2	Gloucestershire Regiment	2
King's Liverpool Regiment	2	Lincolnshire Regiment	2
Loyal North Lancashire Regiment	2	Middlesex Regiment	2
New Zealand units	2	North Irish Horse	2
Seaforth Highlanders	2	Worcestershire Regiment	2
York & Lancaster Regiment	2	Duke of Wellington – West Riding Regiment	1
Highland Light Infantry	1	Labour Corps	1
Leicestershire Regiment	1	17th Bn. London Regiment – Poplar & Stepney Rifles	1
18th Bn. London Regiment – London Irish Rifles	1	Machine Gun Corps – Infantry	1
North Staffordshire Regiment	1	Royal Army Medical Corps	1
Royal West Kent Regiment – Queen's Own	1	Welch Regiment	1
