= Y Ravine Cemetery, Beaumont-Hamel =

WWI CWGC cemetery in Somme, France

Y Ravine Cemetery
- Commonwealth War Graves Commission
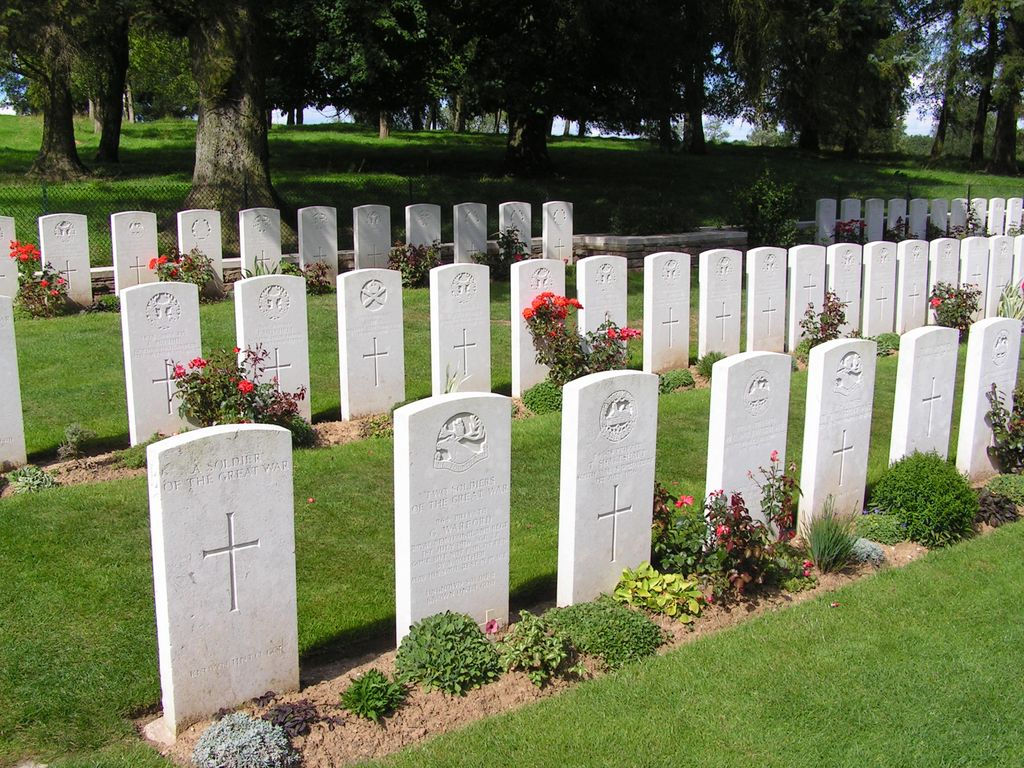
- Used for those deceased 1914–1918
- Established: 1917
- Location: 50°4′34″N 2°39′9″E near Beaumont-Hamel, France
- Total burials: 419
- Commemorated: 53

Burials by nation
- Allied Powers: United Kingdom: 328; Newfoundland: 38

Burials by war
- World War I: 366

Y Ravine Cemetery is a Commonwealth War Graves Commission burial ground for the dead of World War I situated on the grounds of Beaumont Hamel Newfoundland Memorial Park near the French town of Beaumont-Hamel.

== History and Layout ==
Prior to the Battle of the Somme the Germany Army carved out their front line trench just a few metres in front of a deep, steep-sided ravine which afforded a unique terrain in which they were able to protect and conceal large numbers of infantry in deep underground shelters. It came to be known by its wartime nickname from the two stubby arms which fork out in a 'Y' shape at its eastern end, which were just behind the front line trench of July 1, 1916. From there, the main body of the ravine runs east for about 730 metres to what was "Station Road" (near the modern-day D4151 road).

During the initial phase of the Battle of the Somme, which would become known as the Battle of Albert, the British British 29th Division, including the Royal Newfoundland Regiment, were tasked with capturing the village of Beaumont-Hamel from trenches in front of the village of Auchonvillers. There, they found themselves in one of the few places on the battlefront where the attackers held the high ground over the German lines and could clearly see the enemy's front line trenches. However, a slight rise just behind the German front line trench concealed the presence of the ravine and the shelters within. Confident that the week-long preparatory artillery barrage would decimate the defenses and defenders within, when the attack was launched on July 1, 1916, unseen German soldiers of the battle-hardened 119th Reserve Regiment emerged from their concealed bombardment-proof dugouts hidden in the ravine and played a key role in brutally repelling the attack. Ironically, the slope down from the British trenches allowed the Germans to identify the paths through the British barbed wire and spot the locations where the British troops would emerge into no man's land, which they trained their machine guns on.

By the final phase of the battle, the Battle of the Ancre, new trenches and saps had been dug into no man's land to offer the attackers protection as much as 160 metres closer to enemy lines. From these new positions Beaumont-Hamel was again attacked, and with the ravine, was captured by the 51st (Highland) Division on November 13, 1916.

The Beaumont-Hamel Newfoundland Memorial site, including memorials to the 29th and 51st Divisions within it, commemorate these engagements, and Y Ravine Cemetery is within the park. The cemetery sits about 230 metres south of its namesake, which forms most of the northern boundary of the park.

The cemetery was made by the British V Corps in the spring of 1917, when the surrounding battlefield was cleared of remains. It was called originally "Y Ravine Cemetery No. 1" as a second also existed nearby, but the second was concentrated into Ancre British Cemetery after the Armistice. There are now 419 war casualties interred in the cemetery, 275 of which are identified. Roughly one out of every three are unidentified, likely due to the fact that many bodies remained in no man's land for months between the failed initial attacks in July and the eventual success four months later and were either obliterated by shellfire or had decayed beyond recognition.

The cemetery, arranged in a cruciform shape, covers an area of 1,166 square metres and is enclosed by a rubble wall.

== Commemoration ==
As is customary in CWGC cemeteries, a special memorial was erected to 53 soldiers from the United Kingdom and eight from Newfoundland who are known or believed to be buried in the cemetery grounds under stones marking Unknown remains.
