= Hawthorn Ridge Cemetery No. 2 =

War cemetery in Somme, France

- Commonwealth War Graves Commission
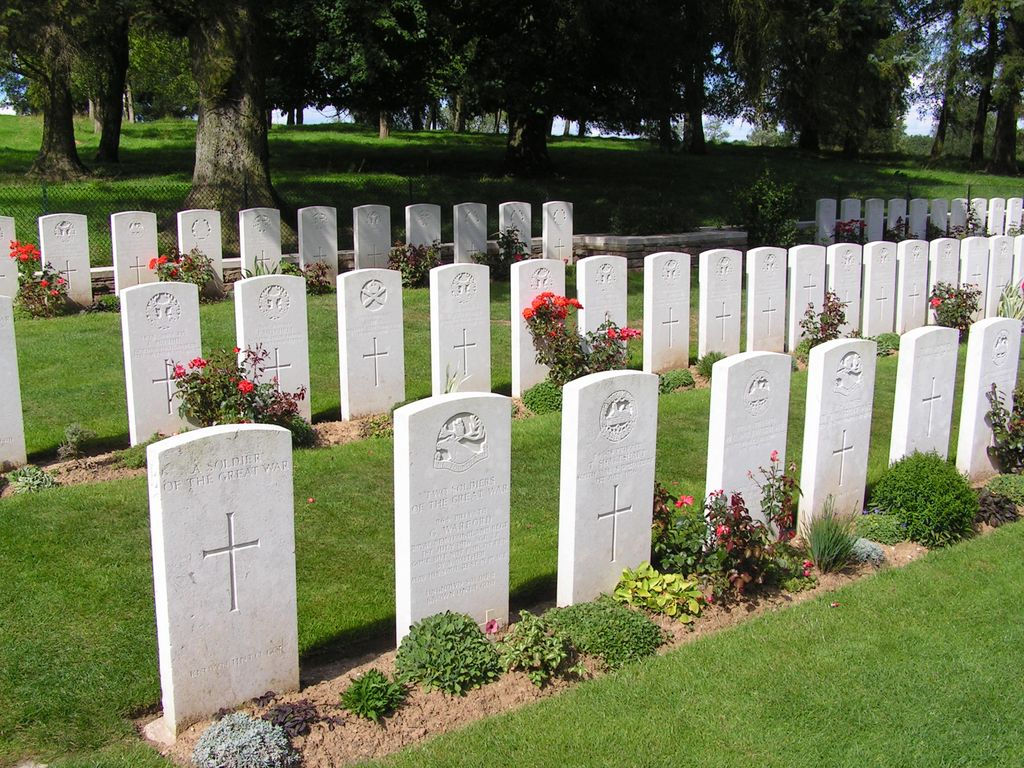
- Used for those deceased 1914–1918
- Established: 1917
- Location: 50°4′41″N 2°38′53″E near Beaumont-Hamel, France
- Total burials: 214

Burials by nation
- Allied Powers: United Kingdom: 190; Newfoundland: 24

Burials by war
- World War I: 214

Hawthorn Ridge Cemetery No. 2 is a Commonwealth War Graves Commission burial ground for the dead of World War I situated on the grounds of the Beaumont-Hamel Newfoundland Memorial near the French town of Beaumont-Hamel.

== Layout and history ==
Hawthorn Ridge Cemetery No. 2 is 460 metres south of Hawthorn Ridge Cemetery No. 1. It was created by the V Corps, originally named V Corps Cemetery No. 12 in the spring of 1917. An additional seven isolated graves were brought into the cemetery following the Armistice. There are now over 200 First World War casualties commemorated in this site. Of these, over 50 are unidentified. The great majority of those located in the cemetery fell on 1 July 1916 during the Battle of the Somme. The cemetery covers an area of 1,019 square metres and it is enclosed by a low stone rubble wall.
