= Hunter's Cemetery =

War cemetery in Somme, France

- Commonwealth War Graves Commission
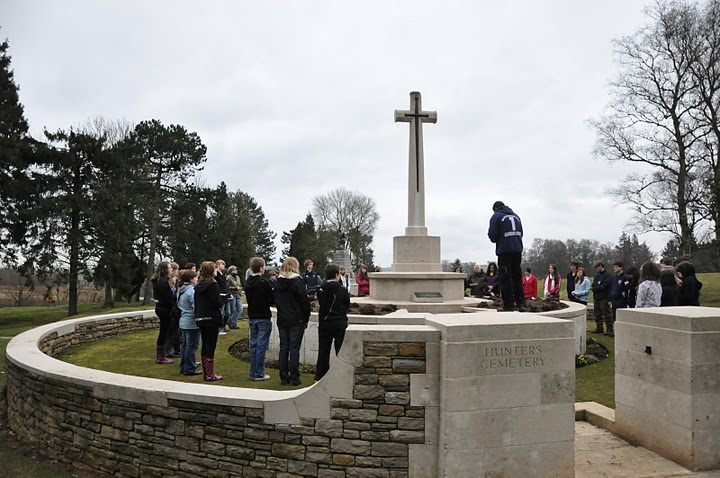
- Used for those deceased 1914–1918
- Established: 1917
- Location: 50°4′41″N 2°38′59″E near Beaumont-Hamel, France
- Total burials: 46

Burials by nation
- Allied Powers: United Kingdom: 46

Burials by war
- World War I: 46

UNESCO World Heritage Site
- Official name: Funerary and memory sites of the First World War (Western Front)
- Type: Cultural
- Criteria: i, ii, vi
- Designated: 2023 (45th session)
- Reference no.: 1321-SE01

Hunter's Cemetery is a Commonwealth War Graves Commission burial ground for the dead of World War I situated on the grounds of Beaumont Hamel Newfoundland Memorial Park near the French town of Beaumont-Hamel.

== History and layout ==
During the Battle of the Somme, German forces near Beaumont-Hamel were attacked in vain on 1 July 1916. The area was finally captured by the 51st (Highland) and 63rd (Royal Naval) Divisions on the following 13 November. Hunter's Cemetery, possibly named after Reverend Hunter, a Chaplain attached to the Black Watch Regiment, is in fact a great shell-hole. Soldiers of the 51st Division, who fell in the capture of Beaumont-Hamel were buried in the shell-hole after the battle. There are now over 40 war casualties commemorated in this site. Hunter's Cemetery stands at the upper end of "Y" Ravine, within Newfoundland Memorial Park.
