= Beaumont Hamel British Cemetery =

WWI CWGC cemetery in Somme, France

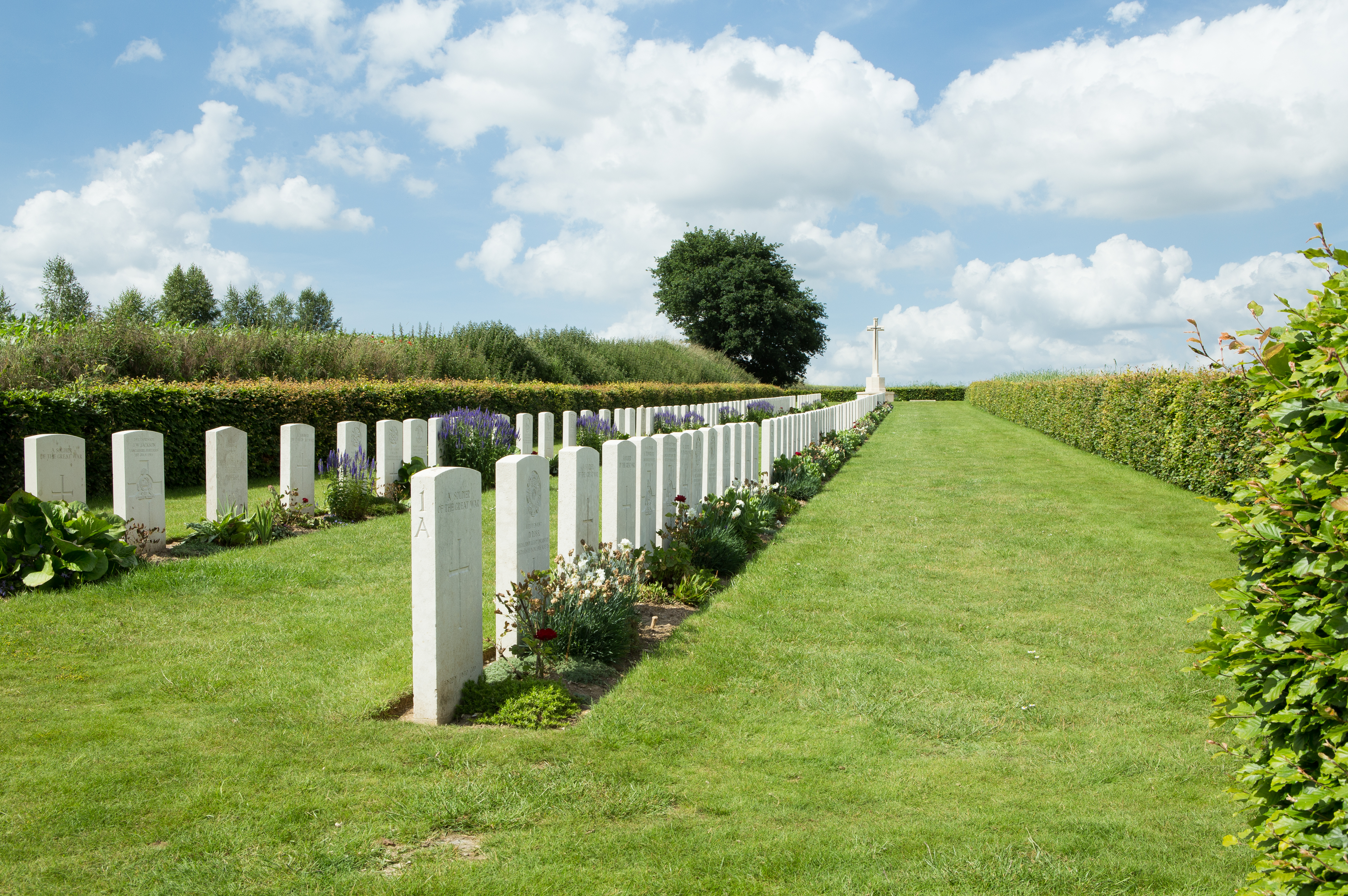

Details
- Established: 1916
- Location: Beaumont-Hamel, Somme, France
- Country: British and Commonwealth (CWGC)
- Coordinates: 50°05′10″N 2°39′00″E
- Type: Military
- No. of graves: 179 total, 98 identified
- Website: Official website
- Find a Grave: Beaumont Hamel British Cemetery

The Beaumont Hamel British Cemetery is a cemetery located in the Somme region of France commemorating British and Commonwealth soldiers who fought in the Battle of the Somme in World War I. The cemetery contains mainly those who died on 1 July 1916 during the first Allied attack on the village of Beaumont-Hamel and in subsequent operations in the area until February 1917.

== Location ==
The cemetery is located 50 yards from the D163 road just west of Beaumont-Hamel and approximately ten kilometers north of the town of Albert, France.

== Fighting near Beaumont-Hamel ==
=== First and Second Attacks ===
The first attack on Beaumont-Hamel occurred on 1 July 1916. It was carried out by the British 29th Division, with the 4th Division holding up the left and the 36th (Ulster) holding the right. The attack failed miserably, with the British suffering over 20,000 killed and 37,000 wounded in three failed waves. In one of the regiments buried in the Ancre Cemetery, the Royal Newfoundland Regiment, only 68 men were fit to fight after the attack, with 324 killed or MIA and 368 wounded.

The second attack on Beaumont-Hamel occurred on 3 September and was also unsuccessful.

=== Third Attack and Capture ===
On 13–14 November 1916 the 51st Highland, 63rd Royal Naval, 39th Western, and 19th Western Divisions finally succeeded in capturing the town.

== Establishment of the cemetery ==
=== History ===
The cemetery was originally called V Corps Cemetery No. 23. It was made during the Battle of the Somme and heavily used until February 1917. After the end of World War I, graves from other battlefields in the area were moved into Beaumont-Hamel. The cemetery was originally designed by W. H. Cowlishaw.

=== Statistics ===
There are a total of 179 burials in the cemetery, of which 98 are identified and 82 are unidentified. Special memorials are dedicated to two casualties known to be buried among the unidentified. 12 casualties from the Manchester Regiment's 2nd, 20th, and 21st Battalions are buried in the cemetery.

Identified Burials by Nationality
Nationality	Number of Burials
United Kingdom	96
Canada	2

Number of Burials by Unit
Lancashire Fusiliers	16	Manchester Regiment	12
Middlesex Regiment	12	Dorsetshire Regiment	7
Queen's – Royal West Surrey Regiment	7	Royal Warwickshire Regiment	6
Seaforth Highlanders	5	Royal Fusiliers – City of London Regiment	4
Honourable Artillery Company	3	Hampshire Regiment	2
Highland Light Infantry	2	North Staffordshire Regiment	2
South Staffordshire Regiment	2	West Yorkshire Regiment	2
Black Watch	1	Border Regiment	1
Canadian burial	1	Devonshire Regiment	1
Duke of Wellington – West Riding Regiment	1	East Lancashire Regiment	1
Gordon Highlanders	1	King's Own Yorkshire Light Infantry	1
Machine Gun Corps	1	Northumberland Fusiliers	1
Royal Dublin Fusiliers	1	Royal Engineers	1
Royal Field Artillery	1	Royal Irish Rifles	1
Royal Newfoundland Regiment	1	Royal Scots	1
