= 51st (Highland) Division War Memorial (Bréville-les-Monts) =

- British Army
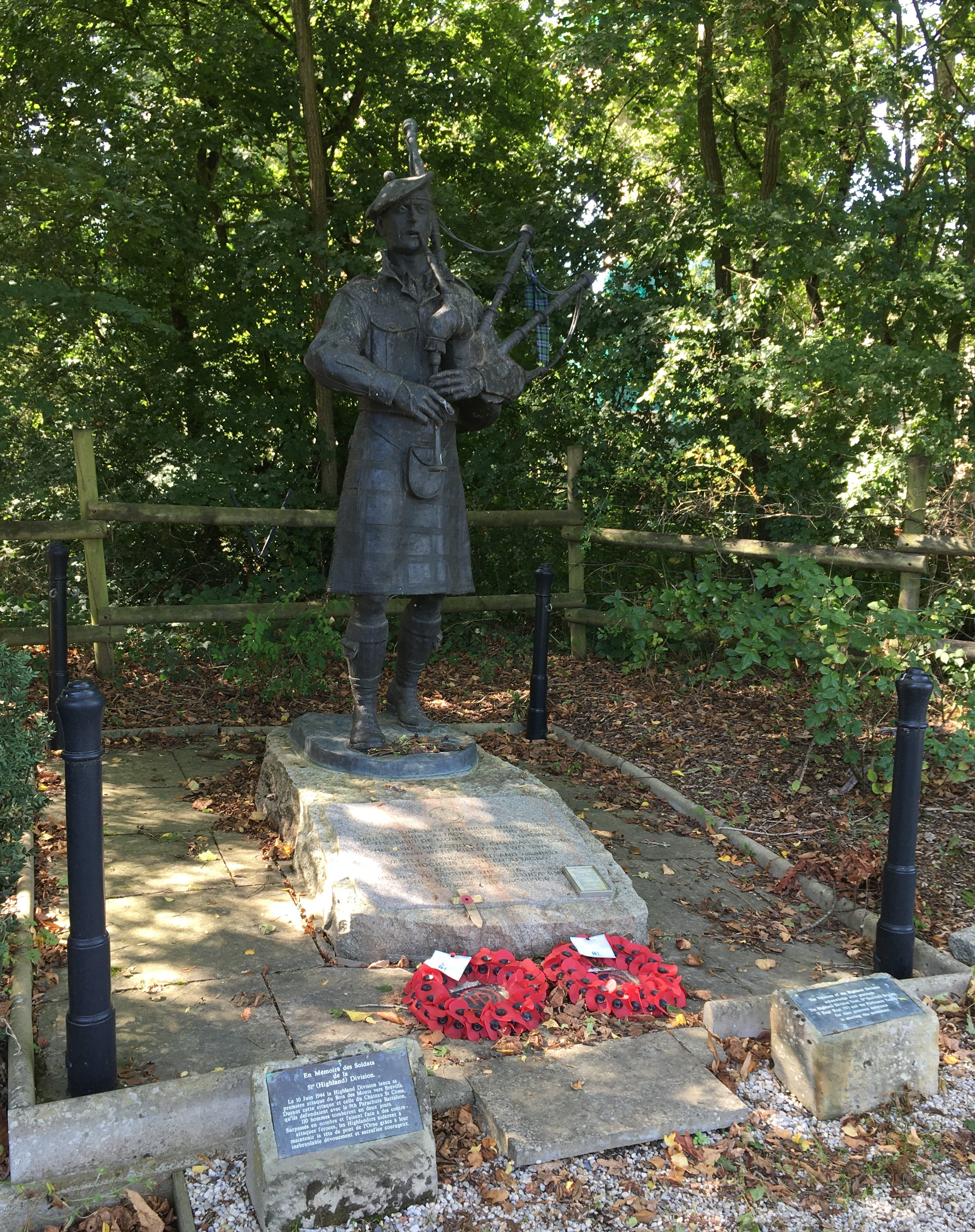
- Bronze piper statue
- For soldiers of the 51st (Highland) Division killed in the Battle of Bréville in 1944
- Location: 49.234435°N 0.223180°W near Bréville-les-Monts

The 51st (Highland) Division War Memorial is a war memorial near Bréville-les-Monts in Normandy. It commemorates the casualties from elements the 51st (Highland) Division of the British Army in actions immediately after D-Day during the Second World War. It was reported in late May 2026 that a bronze statue of a Scottish piper by Scottish artist Alan Beattie Herriot, the largest element of the memorial, had been stolen.

== Background ==
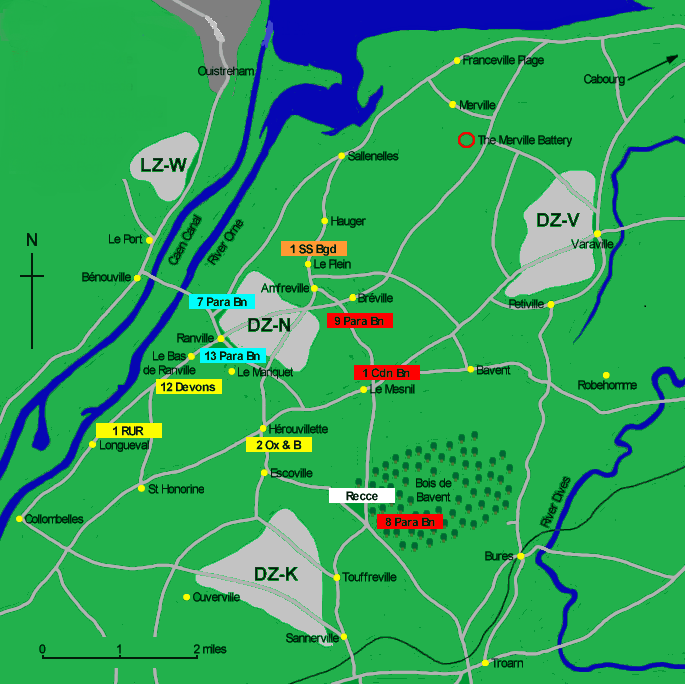
The 6th Airborne Division positions in Normandy 6 June 1944. Bréville-les-Monts lies on the right of high ground between the Orne and the Dives.

On 6 June 1944, the 6th Airborne Division landed in Normandy to secure the left flank of the British landing zone on D-Day. Joining with commandos of the 1st Special Service Brigade, the division was positioned to defend the bridgehead to the east of the River Orne against elements of the 21st Panzer Division from the south and the 346th and 711th Infantry Divisions from the east towards towards Le Havre.

The commandos were sited to defend the north flank, with two parachute brigades to the east, and the 6th Airlanding Brigade to the south, but their defensive line was incomplete, as the small village of Bréville-les-Monts, between the commandos and the 3rd Parachute Brigade, was held by the Germans. Located on the ridge line between the Orne and the Dives, it gave the Germans a view into Ranville at the heart of the British position, the captured Pegasus Bridge and Horsa Bridge, and the British landings at Sword Beach in the distance.

Fighting around the high ground at Bréville-les-Monts, and south towards the Château Saint-Côme, continued over several days. By 10 June, Lieutenant General John Crocker, commander of I Corps, ordered in elements of the 13th/18th Royal Hussars to provide armoured support, and the 51st (Highland) Infantry Division was ordered to take over the southern sector of the Orne bridgehead.

The 5th Battalion Black Watch was attached to the 3rd Parachute Brigade to prepare for an assault to capture Bréville. They formed up to the rear of the 9th Parachute Battalion, ready to attack on 11 June. A company took over the defence of the Château Saint-Côme, and the remainder of the battalion advanced northeast over 250 yards (230 m) of open ground behind a creeping barrage of the artillery of both divisions. When the British artillery ceased fire, the unsuppressed German defence cut down the attack as it approached across the open ground, and the battalion fell back with 200 casualties. An immediate German counterattack failed, as did a renewed British attack with tanks from the 13th/18th Royal Hussars in support. A major German counterattack on 12 June was also repulsed, but the Black Watch around the Château Saint-Côme suffered further casualties, losing nine Bren Gun Carriers and all of their anti-tank guns. They were forced to pull back to the Bois de Mont, where they joined the 9th Parachute Battalion.

A night attack by contingents of the 6th Airborne Division eventually took the village of Bréville-les-Monts before midnight that evening, soon replaced by reinforcements from the 1st Battalion Royal Ulster Rifles.

== Memorial ==
The memorial was erected in 2004, the 60th anniversary of D-Day, on the west side of the Rue de l'Arbre Martin (Route départementale D37B) leading south from Bréville-les-Monts towards Le Mesnil, close to the entrace of the Château Saint-Côme. A plaque records funding and other support from the Highland Division Trust, the 51st (Scottish) Brigade, the 71st Engineer Regiment (V), and the Parkinson family.

It comprises a life-size bronze statue of a kilted Scottish piper playing the Highland bagpipes, mounted on a low plinth, with several plaques in English and French. The sculpture was made by Scottish artist Alan Beattie Herriot, who has also designed different sculptures of pipers for several other Scottish war memorials, including the 51st (Highland) Division War Memorial in Perth. This piper figure was copied for a memorial erected in 2005 at the House of Bruar near Blair Atholl. The bronze piper figure in Bréville-les-Monts was reported stolen overnight between 28 and 29 May 2026.

The main inscription recalls the first attack made by the Highland Division on 10 June 1944 from a position in the Bois de Monts near the memorial toward Bréville, in which 110 men were killed over two days.

Also commemorated nearby are the Dutch Princess Irene Brigade, which suffered in heavy fighting in the area in August 1944, and to the 9th Parachute Regiment and supporting elements in the Battle of the Bois de Monts. A memorial to the 6th Airborne Division stands in Bréville-les-Monts, about one kilometer to the north.

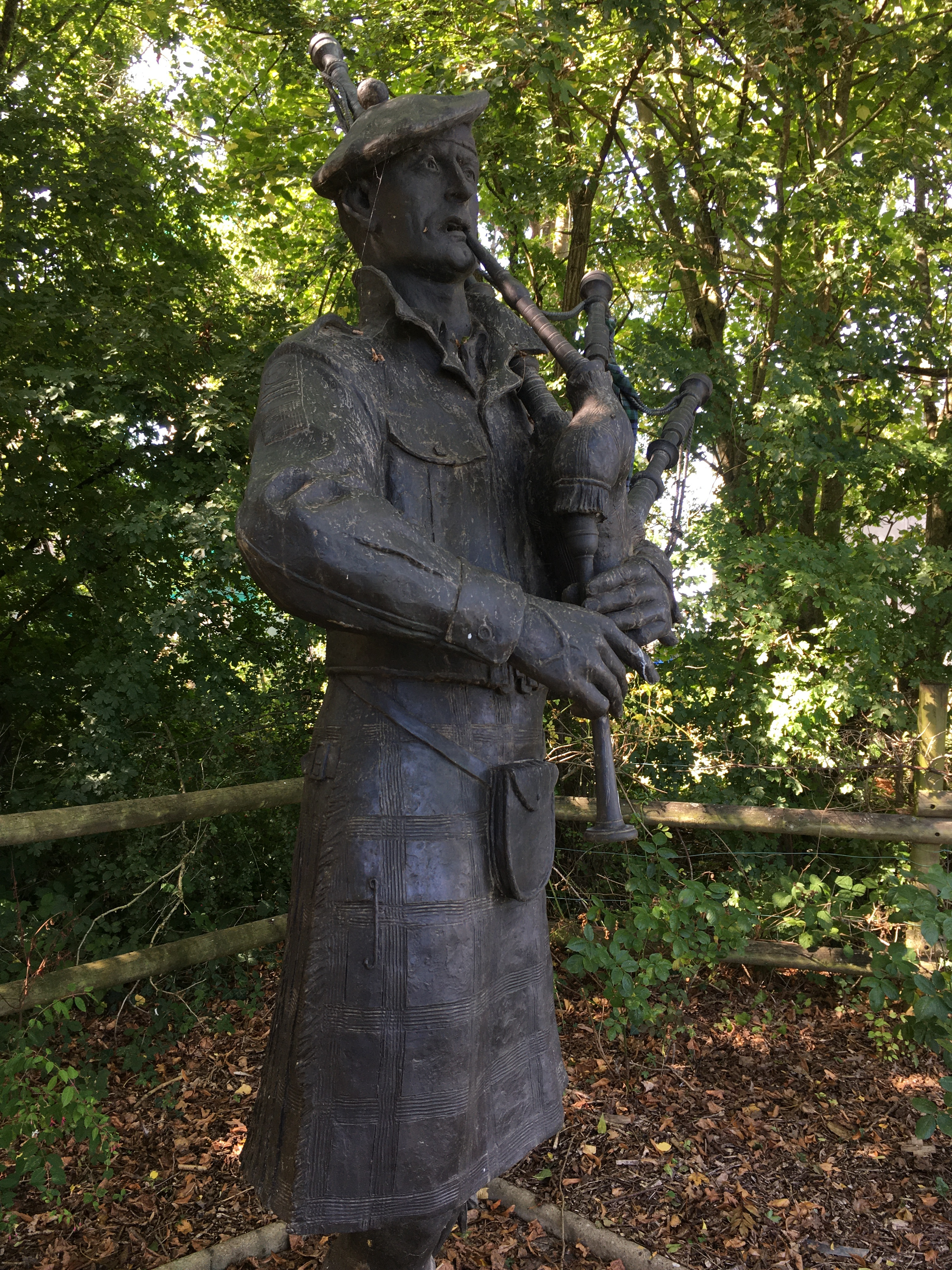
Bronze piper statue

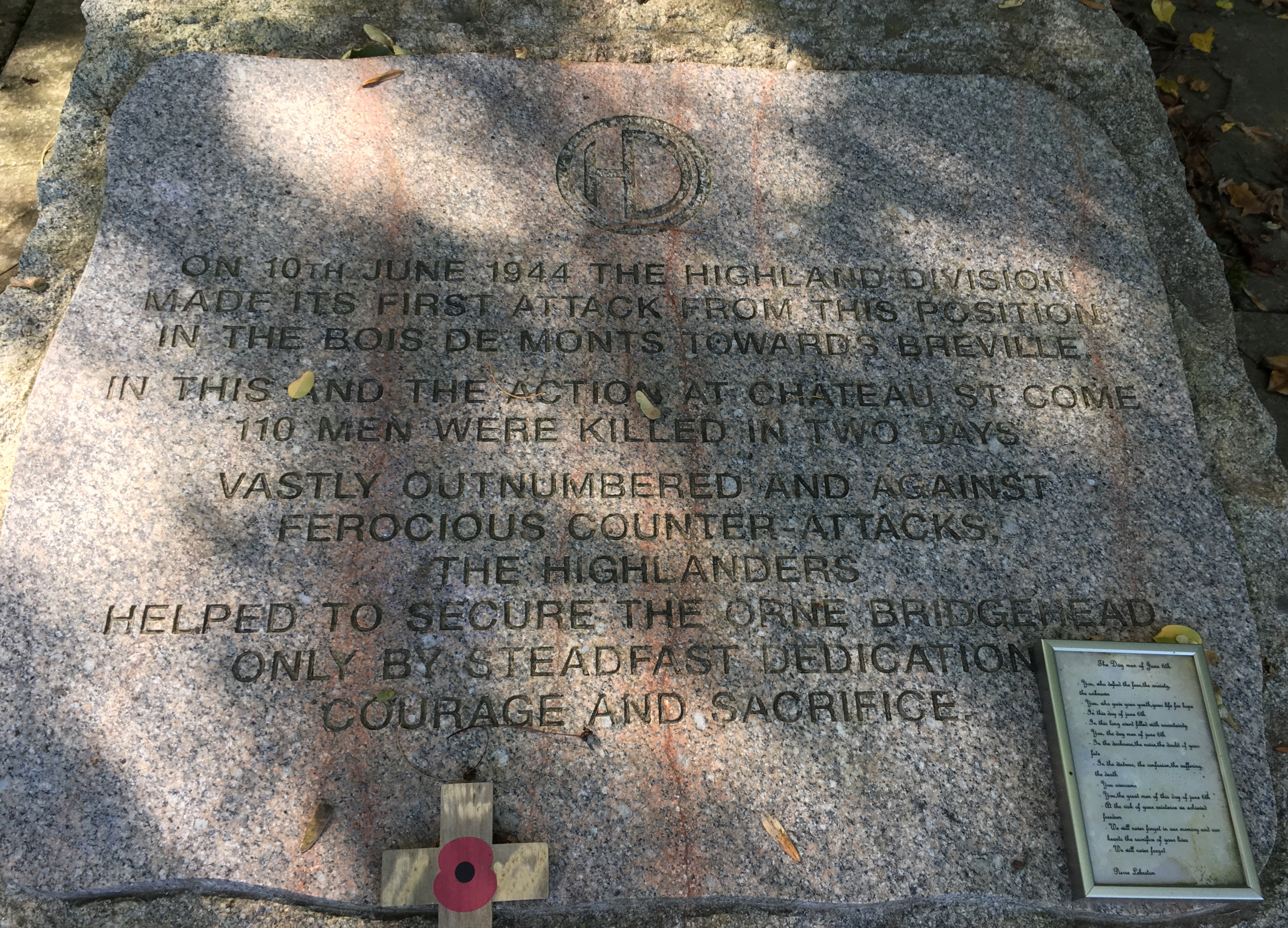
Main plaque in English

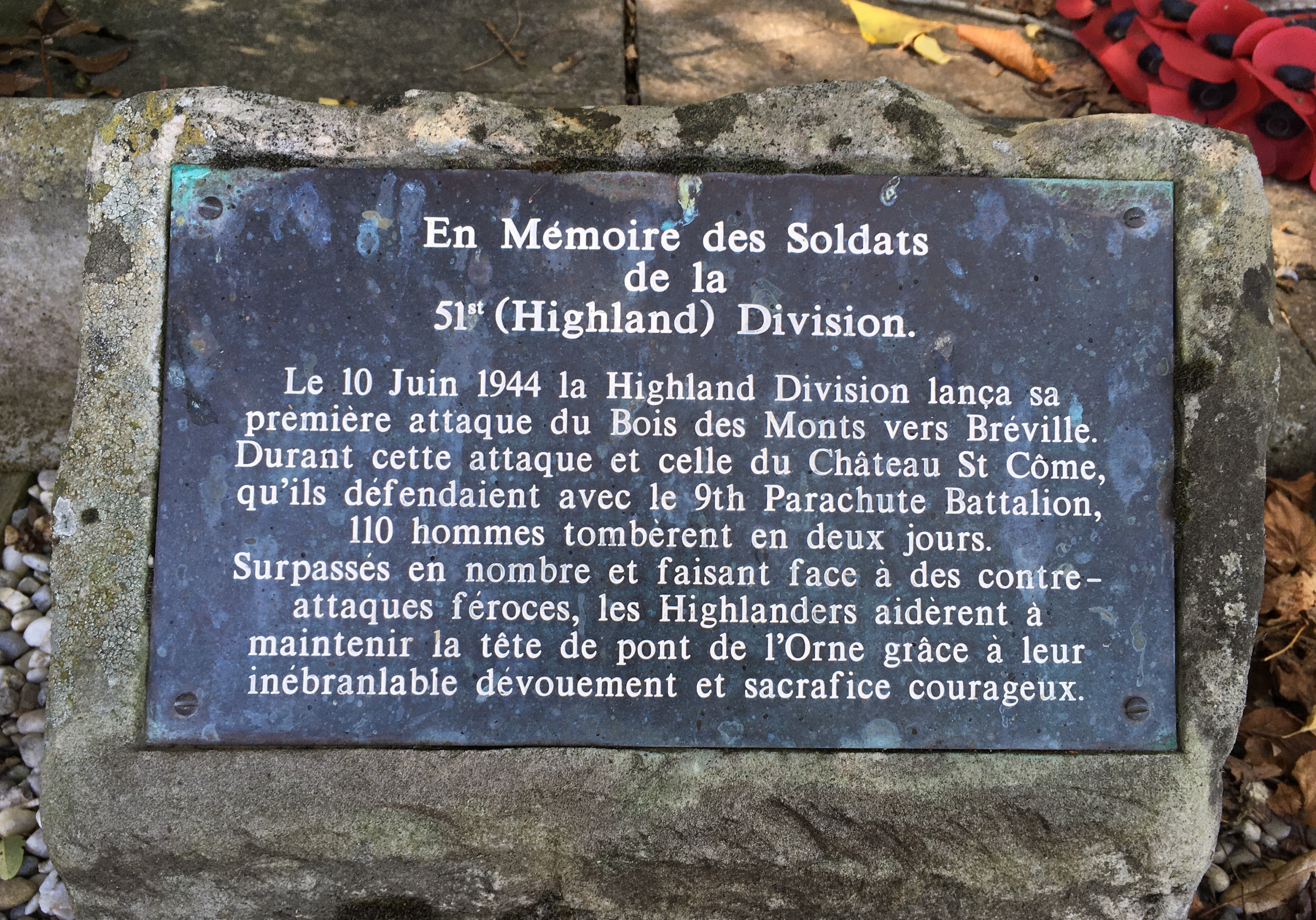
Plaque in French

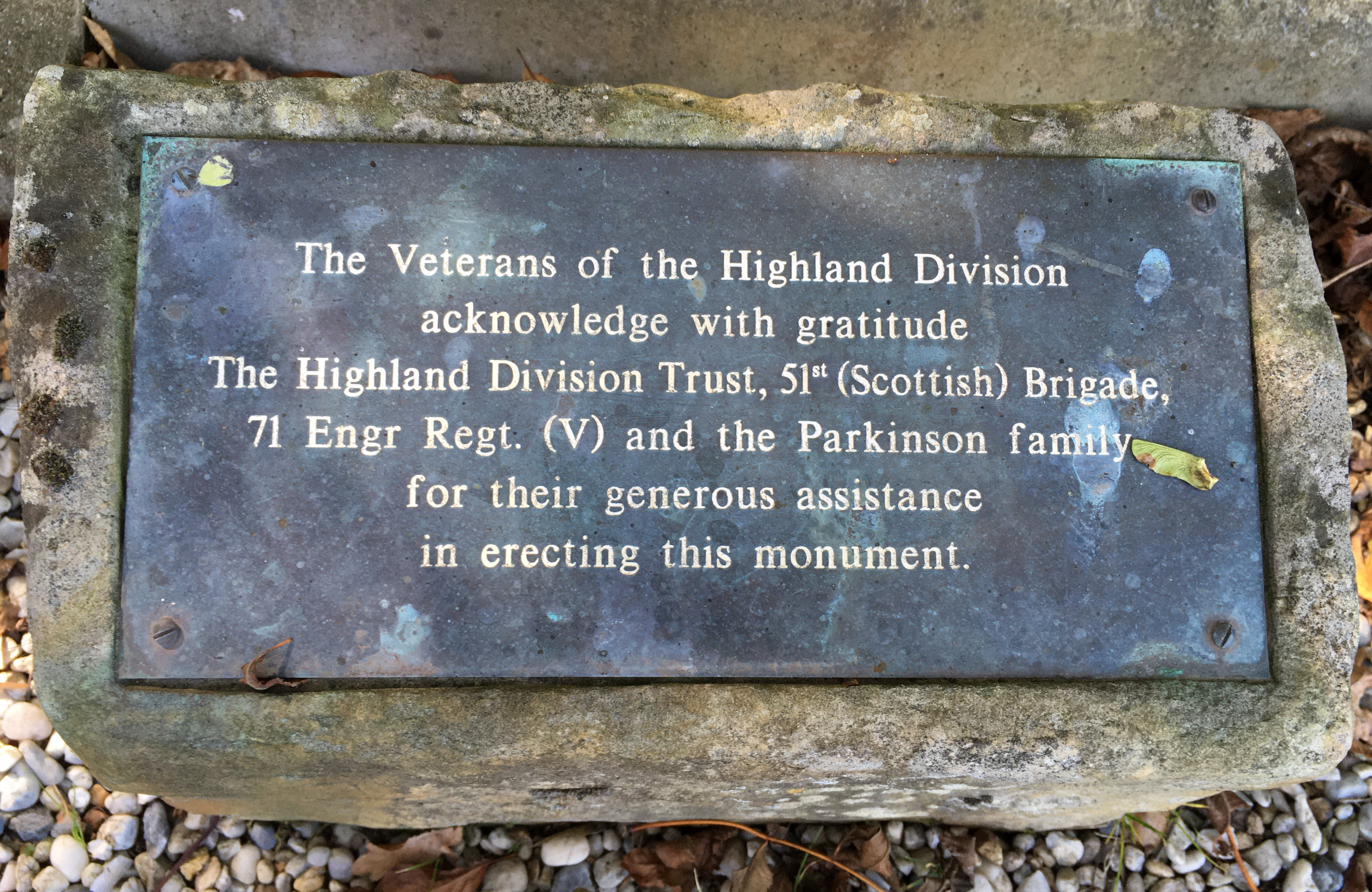
Second plaque in English

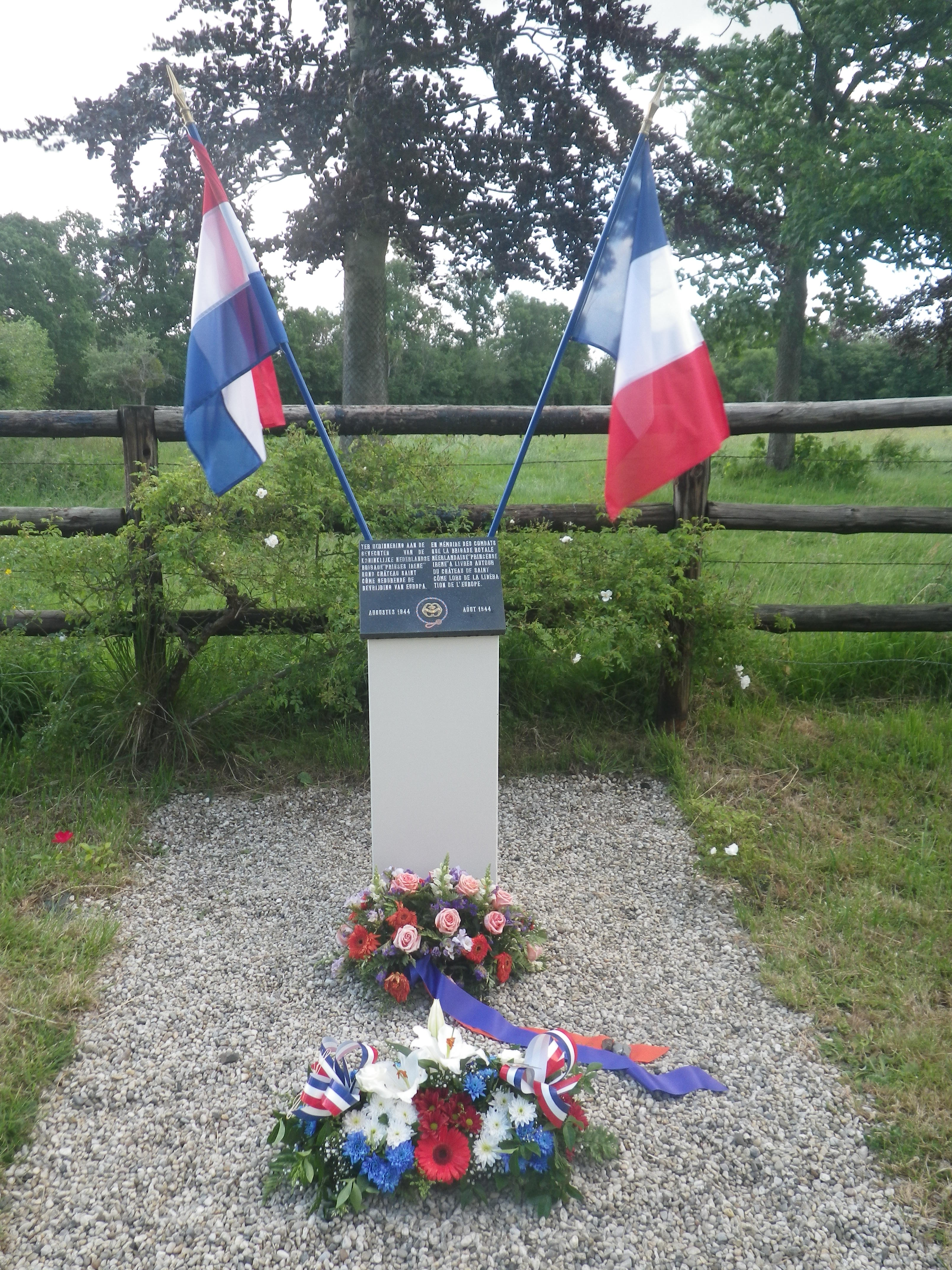
Memorial to the Dutch Princess Irene Brigade

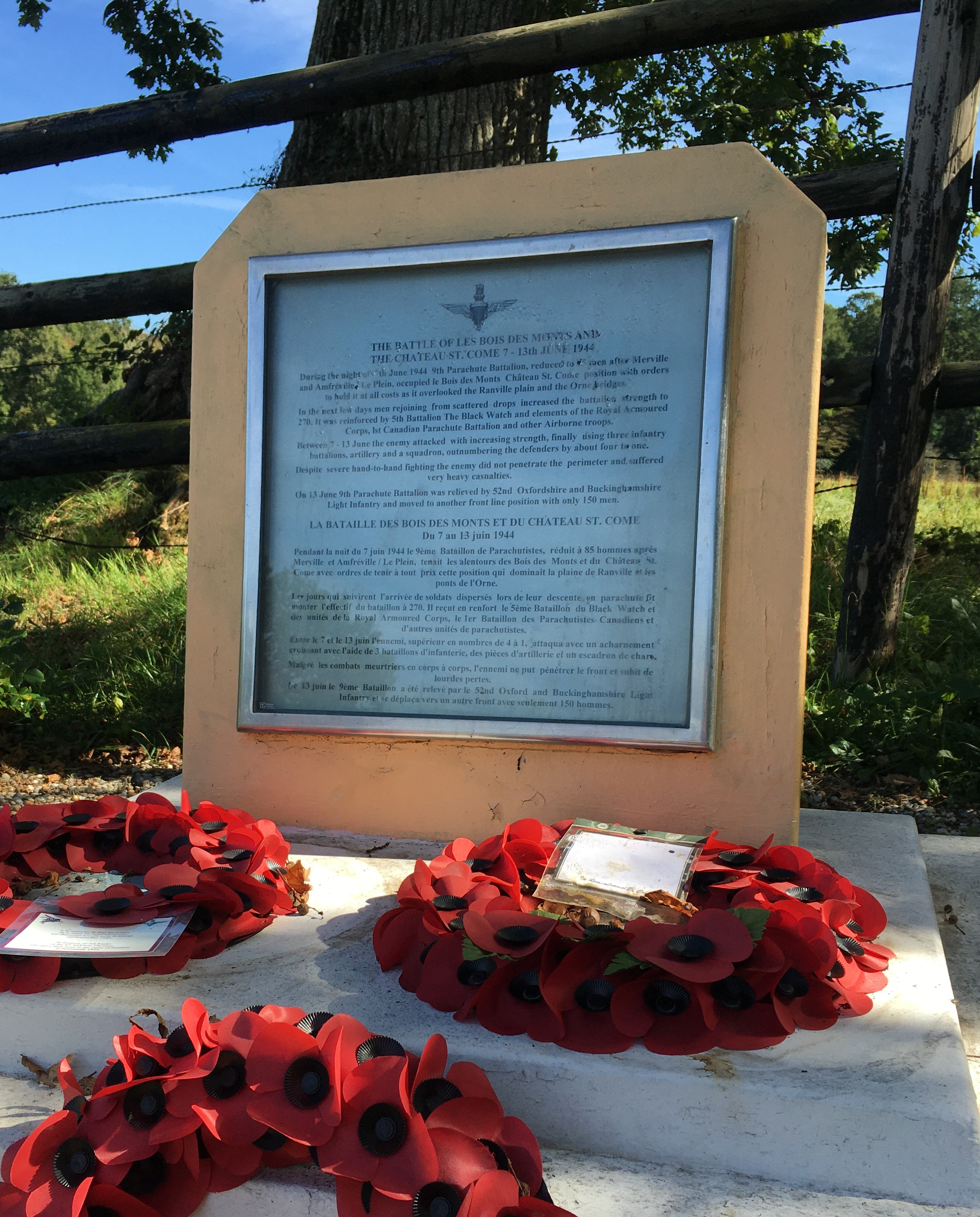
Memorial to the Battle of the Bois de Monts

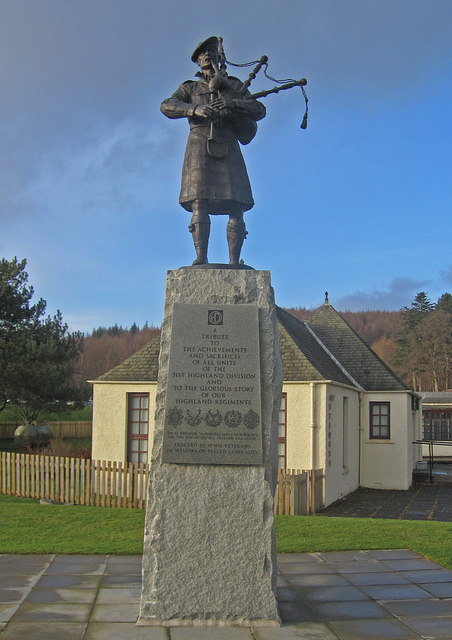
House of Bruar memorial

== See also ==
- 51st (Highland) Division Monument (Beaumont-Hamel), a First World War memorial in the Somme
- 51st (Highland) Division War Memorial (Scotland), Second World War memorial in Perth
