= Rubislaw quarry =

Quarry in Aberdeen, Scotland

Coordinates: 57.1401°N 2.1485°W

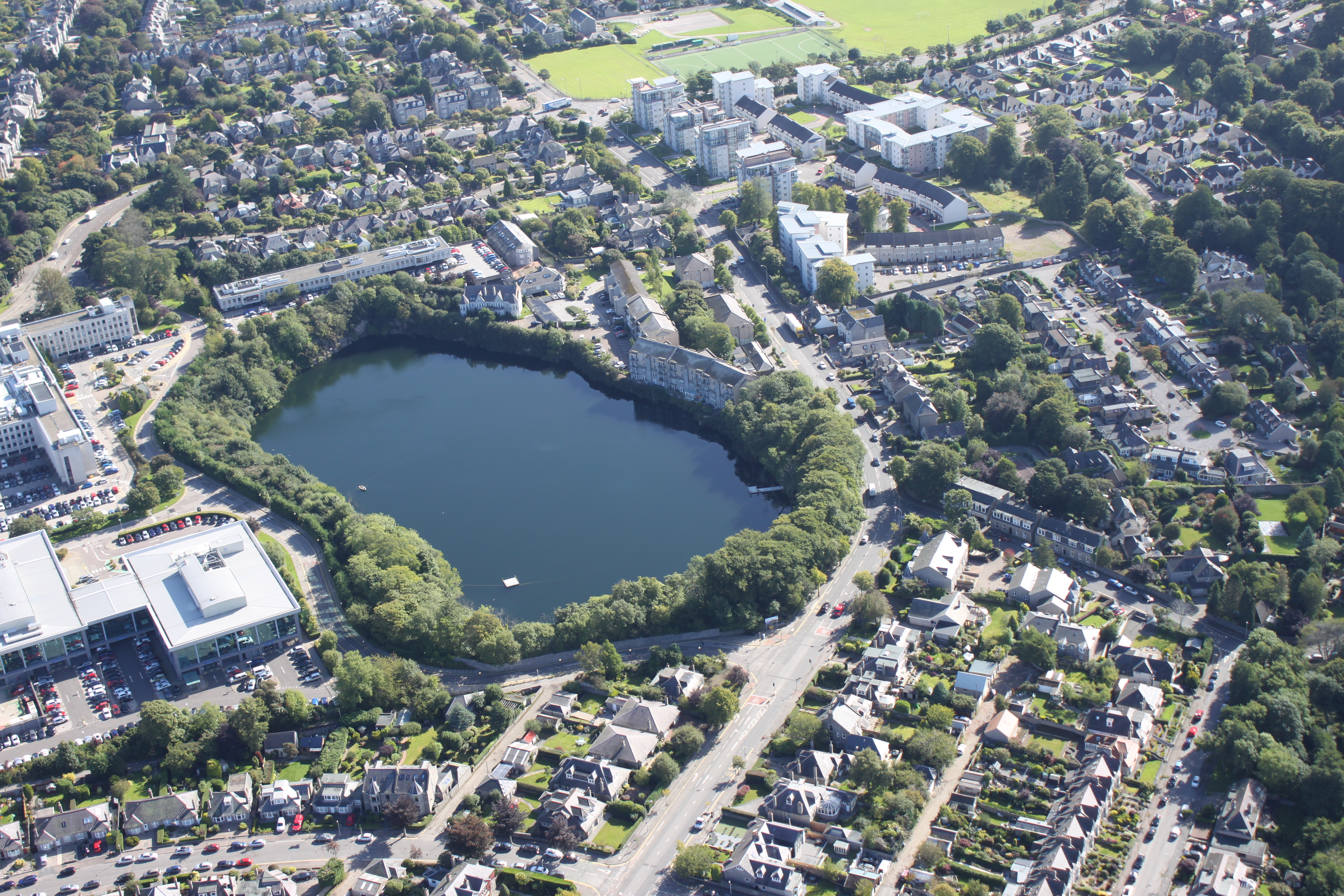
View overlooking the quarry

Rubislaw Quarry is a quarry situated at the Hill of Rubislaw in the west end of the city of Aberdeen, Scotland.

The quarry is one of the biggest man-made holes in Europe at approximately 466 ft. (142m) deep, and with a diameter of 394 ft. (120m). Since its closure in 1971, it has filled with water and is currently inaccessible to the public.

As late as the 1800s, the quarry would have stood on the farmland surrounding Aberdeen but slowly it was encircled as the town grew into a city. In the present day, the quarry's situation feels unusual, sited on a main road, sandwiched between residential areas on three sides and a business park to the north.

An estimated six million tonnes of granite were extracted from the quarry over a period of 200 years which directly contributed to Aberdeen's reputation as the Granite City. The majority of prestigious buildings erected in Aberdeen in the late 18th century and early 19th century were made from the quarry's contents, and designed by the likes of John Smith and Archibald Simpson. One local building of particular note is Marischal College, the second-largest granite building in the world and the current headquarters of Aberdeen City Council.

The granite from the quarry was known for its quality and was used, for example, on Waterloo Bridge in London, the terrace of the Palace of Westminster, and the Forth Bridge.

The extracts from Rubislaw Quarry are described as being 'blue granite' or 'grey granite', as opposed to the 'red granite' found in quarries near Peterhead, Scotland. The colour depends on the hue of quartz and feldspar and its ratio with mica. Matthew Forster Heddle found the quarry a good source of the minerals tourmaline and beryl. Traces of Emerald were also found.

== History ==
Rubislaw quarry was opened in 1740.

In 1778/9, Aberdeen City Council sold it to a businessman for £13, as it was not thought to be a source of good building material.

An advert in the Aberdeen Journal of 16 May 1791 states that a seven-year lease is to be sold by public auction, and advises that a new road for access is being constructed by the owners.

In early 1879, an initiative by the Association for Improving the Condition of the Poor resulted in up to 350 unemployed men presenting themselves to the quarry to be employed in breaking stones.

December 1889 saw the establishment of the Rubislaw Granite Company Limited to take over ownership from Mr. William Gibb of John Gibb & Son due to ill health. William Gibb was to remain a Director but was joined by four others: Robert G. Wilson, Roderick Mackay, Forbes Manson, and Charles Christie. An assessment was given that there were almost 4 million tonnes of 'superior rock' ready for extraction at a likely pace of 50,000 to 60,000 tonnes per year. Profit per tonne was stated to be 1 shilling, 7 pence. During this process, the current leaseholders – 'Alex MacDonald & Co Limited' – lost their lease.

In 1926, George Hutcheon Jones was killed after slipping on a grassy slope at the quarry and falling to the foot of the quarry, reported to be 320 feet. Similarly, in 1936 a man was reported as having fallen over 400 feet into the quarry.

The quarry closed in 1971.

In 2010, the quarry was acquired by former oil consultant Sandy Whyte and Hugh Black, the former managing director of a construction company. The sale price is believed to have been £60,000. In December 2022, plans to reopen the quarry for watersports operated by Sport Aberdeen were announced.

Images of Rubislaw Quarry held by Aberdeen Archives, Gallery & Museums

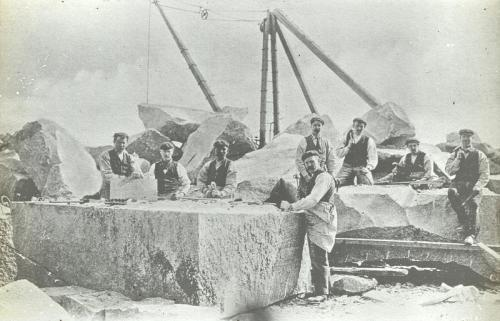
Masons At Work Rubislaw Quarry - George Washington Wilson

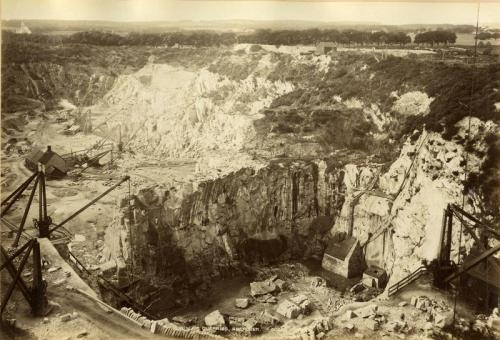
Rubislaw Quarry - George Washington Wilson

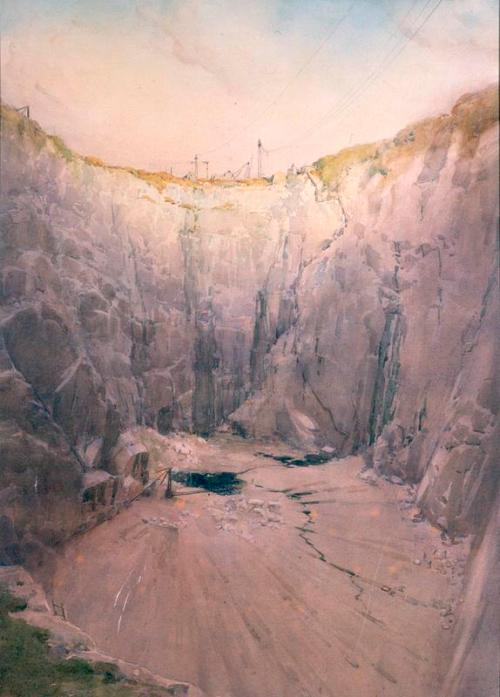
Rubislaw Quarry - Watson Charlton
