= Beaumont-Hamel =

- Commune
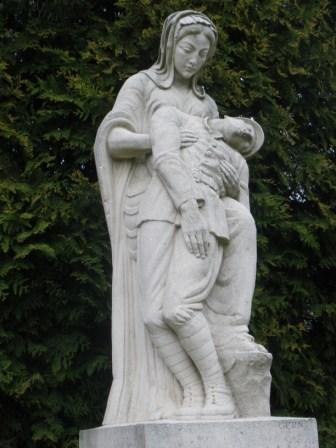
- The monument to the dead, in Beaumont-Hamel

- Coat of arms
- Location of Beaumont-Hamel
- Location within France Location within Hauts-de-France
- Coordinates: 50°05′02″N 2°39′26″E
- Country: France
- Region: Hauts-de-France
- Department: Somme
- Arrondissement: Péronne
- Canton: Albert
- Intercommunality: CC du Pays du Coquelicot

Government
  - Mayor (2020–2026): Agnes Briet-Lavaquerie
- Area^{1}: 8.31 km^{2} (3.21 sq mi)
- Elevation: 75 m (246 ft)
- Highest elevation: 148 m (486 ft)
- Lowest elevation: 70 m (230 ft)
- Population (2023): 200
  - Density: 24/km^{2} (62/sq mi)
- Time zone: UTC+01:00 (CET)
  - Summer (DST): UTC+02:00 (CEST)
- INSEE/Postal code: 80069 /80300
- ^{1} French Land Register data, which excludes lakes, ponds, glaciers > 1 km^{2} (0.386 sq mi or 247 acres) and river estuaries.

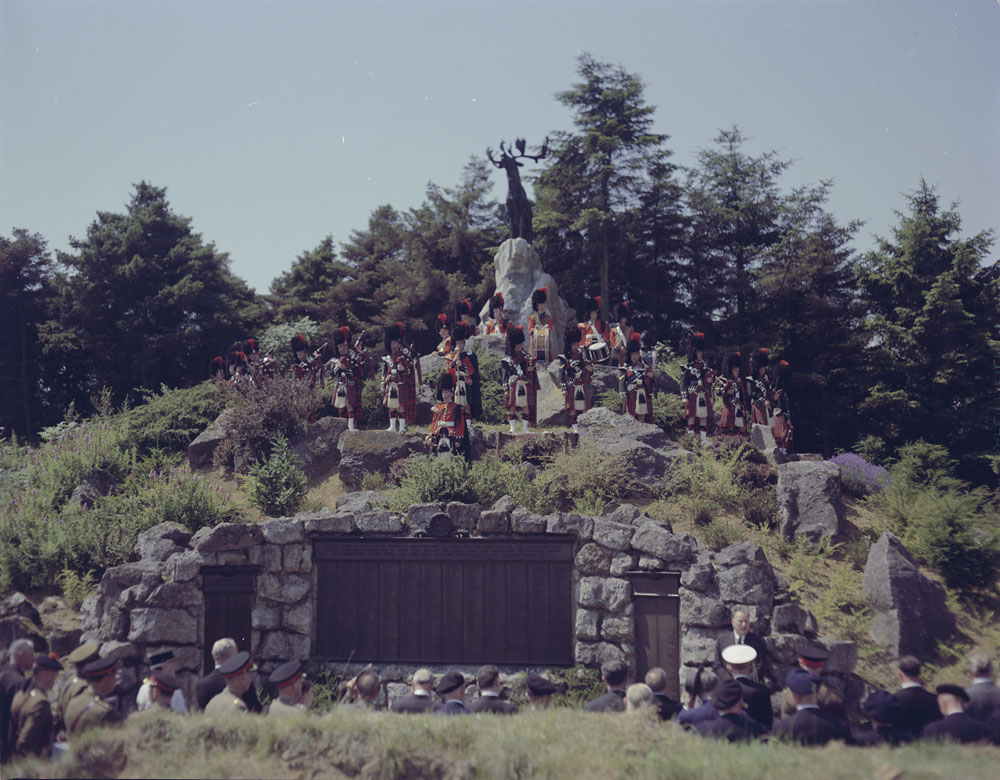
Beaumont Hamel Dedication Ceremony to Newfoundland Regiment

Beaumont-Hamel (French pronunciation: [bomɔ̃ amɛl]) is a commune in the Somme department in Hauts-de-France in northern France.

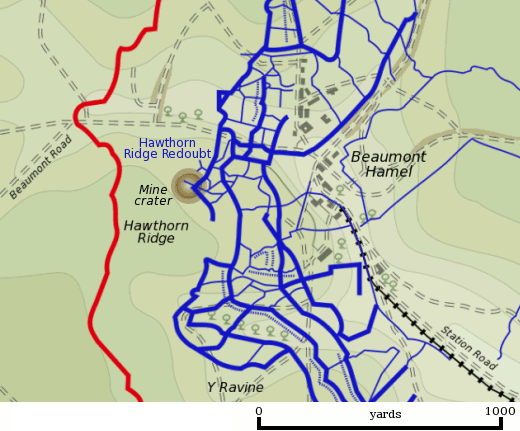
Map of Beaumont-Hamel during the Battle of the Somme in 1916 (red – British front line, blue – German fortifications).

During the First World War, Beaumont-Hamel was close to the front line, near many attacks, especially during the Battle of the Somme, one of the largest allied offensives of the war.

On 1 July 1916, the First Day of the Somme, the 29th Division assaulted the German front line in an attempt to capture the village as part of the Somme Offensive. Included in this division was the Newfoundland Regiment. Newfoundland commemorates this event as Memorial Day on 1 July each year.

Its capture by the 51st (Highland) Division on 18 November 1916 marked the end of the Battle of the Somme. Fought over for many years, by 1918, the village had been almost totally destroyed.

The banks of white chalk at Beaumont-Hamel led to a sector of British trenches being nicknamed "White City". To the west of the village was Hawthorn Ridge Redoubt, one of the sites of the mines exploded on the first day of the Battle of the Somme.

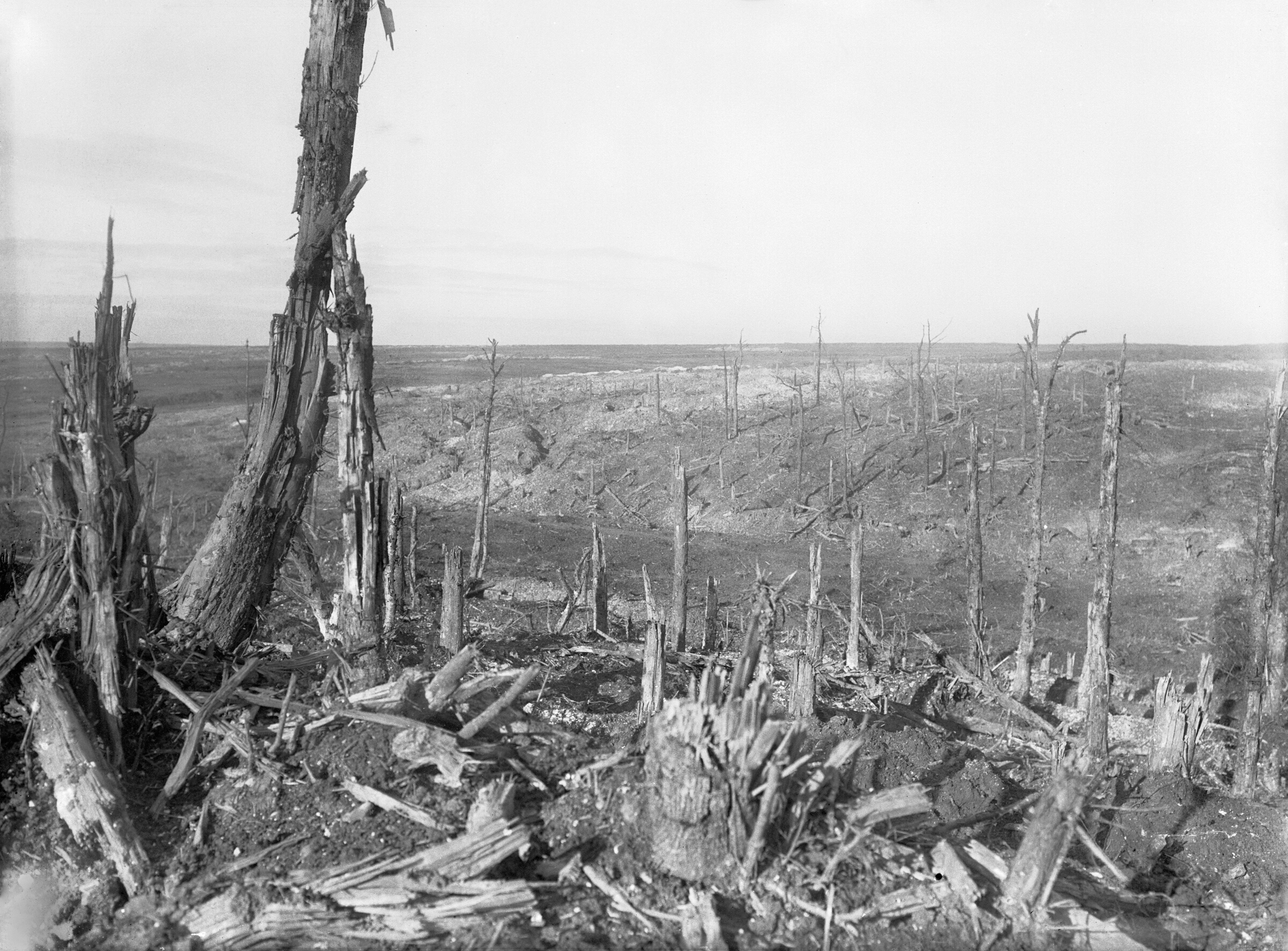
The fields around Beaumont-Hamel after the Battle of the Somme.

== Notable sights ==
As there was heavy fighting in this area during the Great War, there are many cemeteries and monuments, among which:

- A number of British cemeteries (among which Beaumont-Hamel British Cemetery)
- Beaumont-Hamel Newfoundland Memorial. One of only two National Historic Sites of Canada outside Canada (the other being the Canadian National Vimy Memorial) and includes three British Cemeteries (Y Ravine Cemetery, Hawthorn Ridge Cemetery No. 2 and Hunter's Cemetery) as well as the Scottish Monument and a memorial to the 29th division (of which the Newfoundland Regiment was a part).
- Hawthorn Ridge Crater
