= 51st (Highland) Division War Memorial (Scotland) =

War memorial in Perth, Scotland

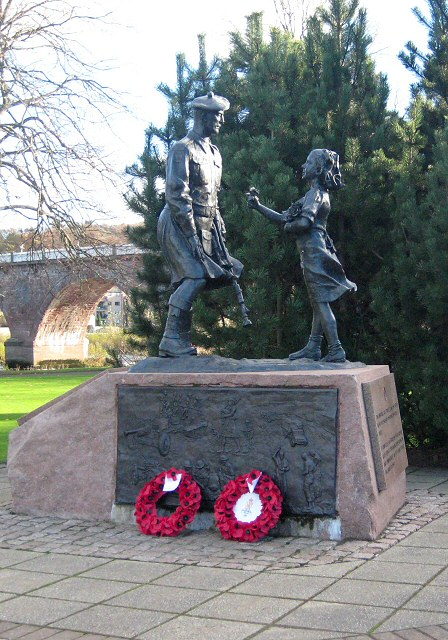
- The memorial in 2007
- Interactive map of 51st (Highland) Division War Memorial
- Location: North Inch; Perth, Perth and Kinross; Scotland
- Coordinates: 56.3992°N 3.4278°W
- Type: Statue
- Material: Granite plinth and tablet Bronze plaque and statue
- Height: 8 feet (2.4 m)
- Opening date: 13 May 1995 (31 years ago)
- Dedicated to: Soldiers of the 51st (Highland) Division lost in World War II

The 51st (Highland) Division War Memorial, in the North Inch public park in Perth, Perth and Kinross, Scotland, is dedicated to the soldiers of the 51st (Highland) Division lost in World War II. It was unveiled on 13 May 1995, marking the 50th anniversary of the conclusion of the war.

The bronze sculptures depict a Highland piper being handed a rose from a bunch of flowers held by a young Dutch girl. A bronze dedication plaque is mounted on a tablet on the granite base. Another plaque, listing the regiment's battle honours, is at the rear. By the steps leading up to the memorial is a tablet explaining the memorial's symbolism. Two bronze relief plaques are on the sides of the base; one is a montage of soldiers in the field, the other depicts an artillery piece, an armoured personnel carrier, a tank, medics treating a wounded soldier, a piper leading two soldiers into battle, a chaplain at a burial service and three lorries at a depot.

== See also ==
- 51st (Highland) Division Monument (Beaumont-Hamel), a First World War memorial in the Somme
- 51st (Highland) Division War Memorial (Bréville-les-Monts), a Second World War memorial in Normandy
