= 51st (Highland) Division War Memorial (Beaumont-Hamel) =

Memorial in France

Coordinates: 50°4′25″N 2°38′53″E

51st Highland Division Memorial at Beaumont-Hamel
- United Kingdom
- For The 51st (Highland) Division during the First World War
- Unveiled: 28 September 1924
- Location: near Beaumont-Hamel, France
- Designed by: George Henry Paulin
- La a'Blair s'math n Cairdean

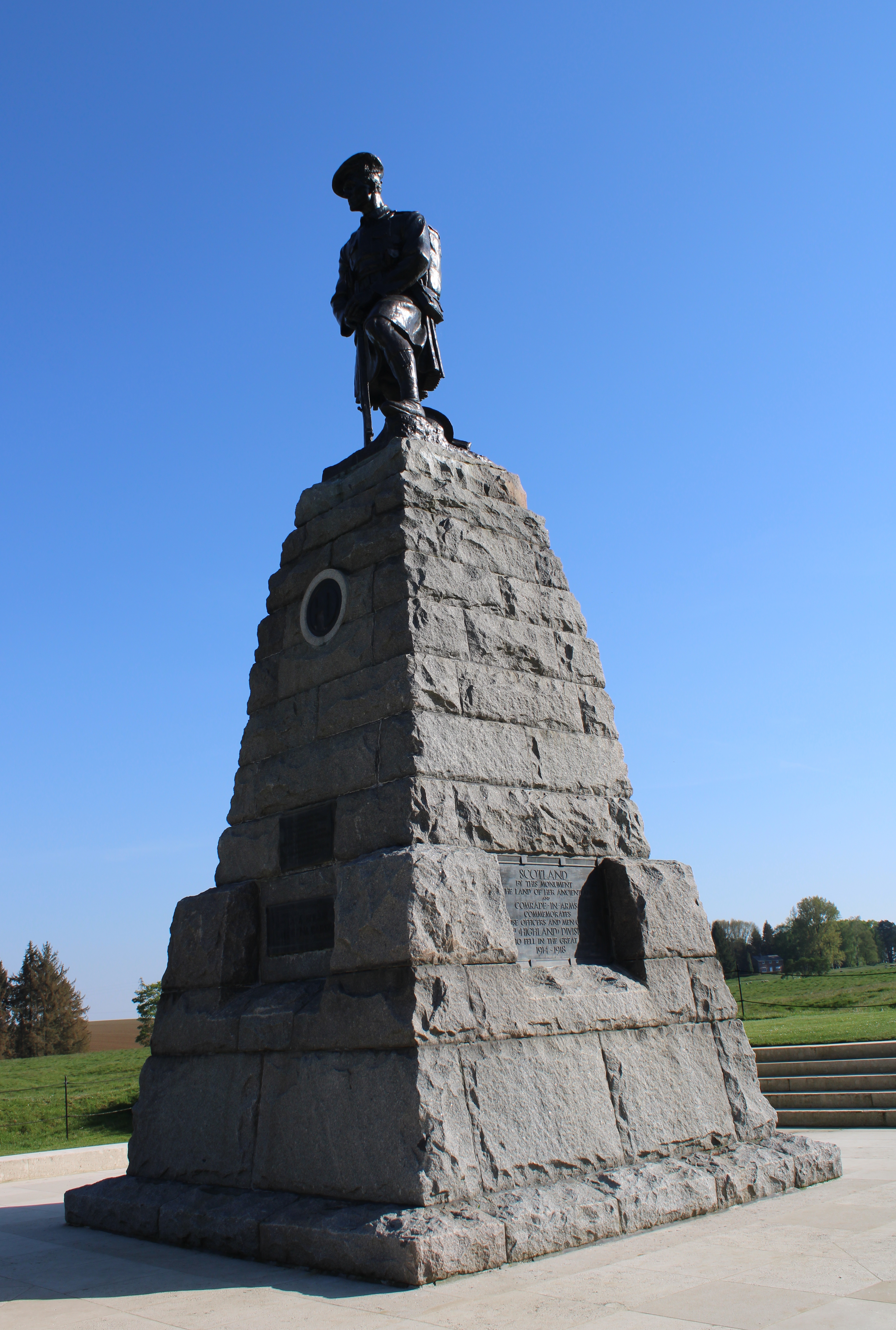
Memorial of Beaumont-Hamel

The 51st (Highland) Division Memorial at Beaumont-Hamel is a memorial in France commemorating the soldiers of the 51st (Highland) Division killed during World War I. The memorial is located near Y Ravine on the 84-acre (340,000 m^{2}) Beaumont-Hamel Newfoundland Memorial site. This position had been the scene of the Division's first major victory on 13 November 1916 during the Battle of the Ancre, the closing stage of the Battle of the Somme.

== Memorial ==
The ground originally donated by the commune of Beaumont-Hamel to the Veterans of the 51st (Highland) Division, for the purposes of a memorial, was found to be unstable because of the many dugouts on the site. Lieutenant Colonel Nangle, the former Roman Catholic padre of the Royal Newfoundland Regiment who was largely responsible for the establishment of the Beaumont Hamel Newfoundland Memorial, offered the association a location overlooking Y Ravine within the boundaries of the site. Y Ravine was a forked gully (hence its name) which contained a formidably-fortified warren of defensive positions that had been the scene of a stunning victory by the Highland Division on 13 November 1916.

The sculptor selected for the 51st Division Monument was George Henry Paulin. The base of the monument consists of rough blocks of Rubislaw granite which were produced by Garden & Co. in Aberdeen, Scotland, and are assembled in a pyramid form. Company Sergeant Major Bob Rowan of the Glasgow Highlanders was used as the model for the kilted figure atop the memorial, though the face is that of Paulin's own brother, Charles. The figure faces east towards the village of Beaumont-Hamel. On the front of the memorial is a plaque inscribed in Gaelic: Là a' bhlàir 's math na Cairdean which in English translates into "Friends are good on the day of battle".

The 51st Division Memorial was unveiled on 28 September 1924 by Marshal of France Ferdinand Foch, the former Allied Supreme Commander. The memorial was dedicated by the Reverend Sinclair, who had been a chaplain with the Division. The pipers of the 2nd Battalion, Argyll and Sutherland Highlanders played Flowers of the Forest during the event. The memorial was re-dedicated on 13 July 1958, the front panel now also commemorating those of the Division who died during the Second World War.

== See also ==
- 51st (Highland) Division War Memorial (Scotland), Second World War memorial in Perth
- 51st (Highland) Division War Memorial (Bréville-les-Monts), Second World War memorial in Normandy
