= List of World War I memorials and cemeteries in Pas-de-Calais =

This is a List of World War I memorials and cemeteries in Pas-de-Calais, within the historic County of Artois and present day Pas-de-Calais Department of the Nord-Pas-de-Calais region, located in northeastern France. World War I battles in this area of the Western Front include the First Battle of Artois (December 1914 – January 1915), the Second Battle of Artois (9–15 May 1915), and the Third Battle of Artois (25 September–15 October 1915).

== Background ==
Following the various declarations of war which were to lead to the First World War, the German Army opened the war on her western front by first invading Luxembourg and Belgium and then gaining military control of important industrial regions in France. The German Army forced the Allied armies to retreat until the Battle of the Marne was fought, when the tide turned and the German Army was forced to retreat northwards. They did so to the river Aisne, dug in on the high ground there, and fought the First Battle of the Aisne. This encounter was inconclusive and what historians call the race to the sea followed, during which neither side was able to achieve a breakthrough as they edged to the north and at the conclusion both sides were to dig in along a meandering line of fortified trenches, stretching from the North Sea to the Swiss frontier with France. This line, the Western Front, remained essentially unchanged for most of the war. A war of movement was over and a type of warfare that no side had planned for was to take its place: a static war of attrition with both sides entrenched on either side of the front line.

Between 1915 and 1917, there were several major offensives along this front. The attacks employed massive artillery bombardments and massed infantry advances. However a combination of entrenchments, machine gun nests, barbed wire, and artillery repeatedly inflicted severe casualties on the attackers and counterattacking defenders and as a result, no significant advances were made. Among the most costly of these offensives were the Battle of Verdun with a combined 700,000 dead, the Battle of the Somme with more than a million casualties, and the Battle of Passchendaele or "Third Ypres", which saw roughly 600,000 casualties.

Both sides tried to break the deadlock by introducing new military technology, including poison gas, aircraft and tanks but it was improved tactics that eventually restored some degree of mobility to the conflict. The German spring offensive of 1918 was made possible by the Treaty of Brest-Litovsk that marked the end of the conflict on the Eastern Front. Using the recently introduced infiltration tactics, the German armies advanced nearly 60 miles (97 kilometres) to the west, which marked the deepest advance by either side since 1914 and they very nearly succeeded in forcing a breakthrough.

The Germans could not in the end break the Allied line and now the numerical advantage given the Allies by the volume of soldiers arriving from the United States of America fuelled an inexorable advance by the Allied armies during the second half of 1918. The German Army commanders finally realised that defeat was inevitable, and the government was forced to sue for conditions of an armistice. This took place on 11 November 1918 and the terms of peace were agreed upon with the signing of the Treaty of Versailles in 1919.

After the Battle of the Marne and the Battle of the Aisne, the encounters between the two opposing armies moved northwards towards Compiègne on 17 to 18 September 1914, to Roye on 22 September 1914, the Battle of Albert from 27 to 28 September 1914, and then the Battle of Arras from 30 September to 5 October 1914. From 4 to 8 October 1914 there was fighting at the Battle of La Bassée and at Neuve Chapelle. The two armies then continued to move northwards until the Yser and the North Sea coast were reached.

Neuve Chapelle was to see a further Battle of Neuve Chapelle from 10 to 13 March 1915, followed by the Battle of Aubers Ridge on 9 May 1915, Battle of Festubert from 15 to 25 May 1915, and the Battle of Loos from 25 September to 18 October 1915.

No major attacks took place in the Arras sector from the end of October 1915 to April 1917, but then we see the huge Battle of Arras fought from 9 April to 17 May 1917, fighting at Hill 70 in August 1917, the "Kaiser's Battle" from 21 to 28 March 1918, the Battle of the Lys in April 1918, and the Second Battle of Arras in August 1918.

== Sector 1. Arras: From south of Ploegsteert to Festubert ==
The Battle of Armentières was part of the so-called "Race to the Sea", the series of battles that were ultimately to define the line of the Western Front as trench warfare finally took over in the autumn of 1914.

=== Cite Bonjean (New Zealand Memorial) ===
This memorial is located in the Cite Bonjean Military Cemetery, Armentières, and commemorates 47 officers and men of the New Zealand Division who died in the neighbourhood of Armentières and have no known grave. The cemetery and memorial were designed by Sir Herbert Baker.

=== Le Quesnoy Memorial ===
In November 1918, just a week before the end of the First World War, the New Zealand Division captured the French town of Le Quesnoy. It was the New Zealanders' last major action in the war and to this day the town of Le Quesnoy continues to mark the important role that the country played in its history. Streets are named after New Zealand places, there is the New Zealand memorial, and a primary school bears the name of a New Zealand soldier. Le Quesnoy was occupied by the German Army for most of the First World War but on 4 November 1918, it was attacked by men of the New Zealand Rifle Brigade, who scaled the high walls of the outer ramparts and seized the German Commander and his garrison of over 1,000 men. On the face of the walls is a memorial commemorating their success and the ninety New Zealand lives that were lost in the process. After resisting the German offensive in the spring of 1918, the Allied Armies (including American troops), under the command of General Foch, launched a counter-attack along the length of the Western Front in what was to become known as the Hundred Days Offensive. On 21 August, the British Army launched the first of a number of attacks on the Western Front in the sectors under its control: Amiens, Albert, Arras and Bapaume. The Allied troops advanced up to the Hindenburg Line which they breached at Saint-Quentin Canal on 5 October and at Le Nord Canal three days later. Lille and Douai were liberated on 17 October, and the British Army pressed on towards the Belgian border while the New Zealand Division was given the job of liberating Le Quesnoy. The 18th century Vauban fortifications protecting the town encouraged the Germans garrisoned there to hold out against the Allied advance; however the precision of the New Zealand artillery disrupted the organization of the German defence. In the general confusion Kiwi soldiers managed to set up a ladder on the south side of the town and enter through a sluice gate. Led by Lieutenant Leslie Averill, the New Zealanders completely surprised the Germans who, after much fighting in the streets, surrendered the town on the evening of 4 November. The Armistice was signed a week later.

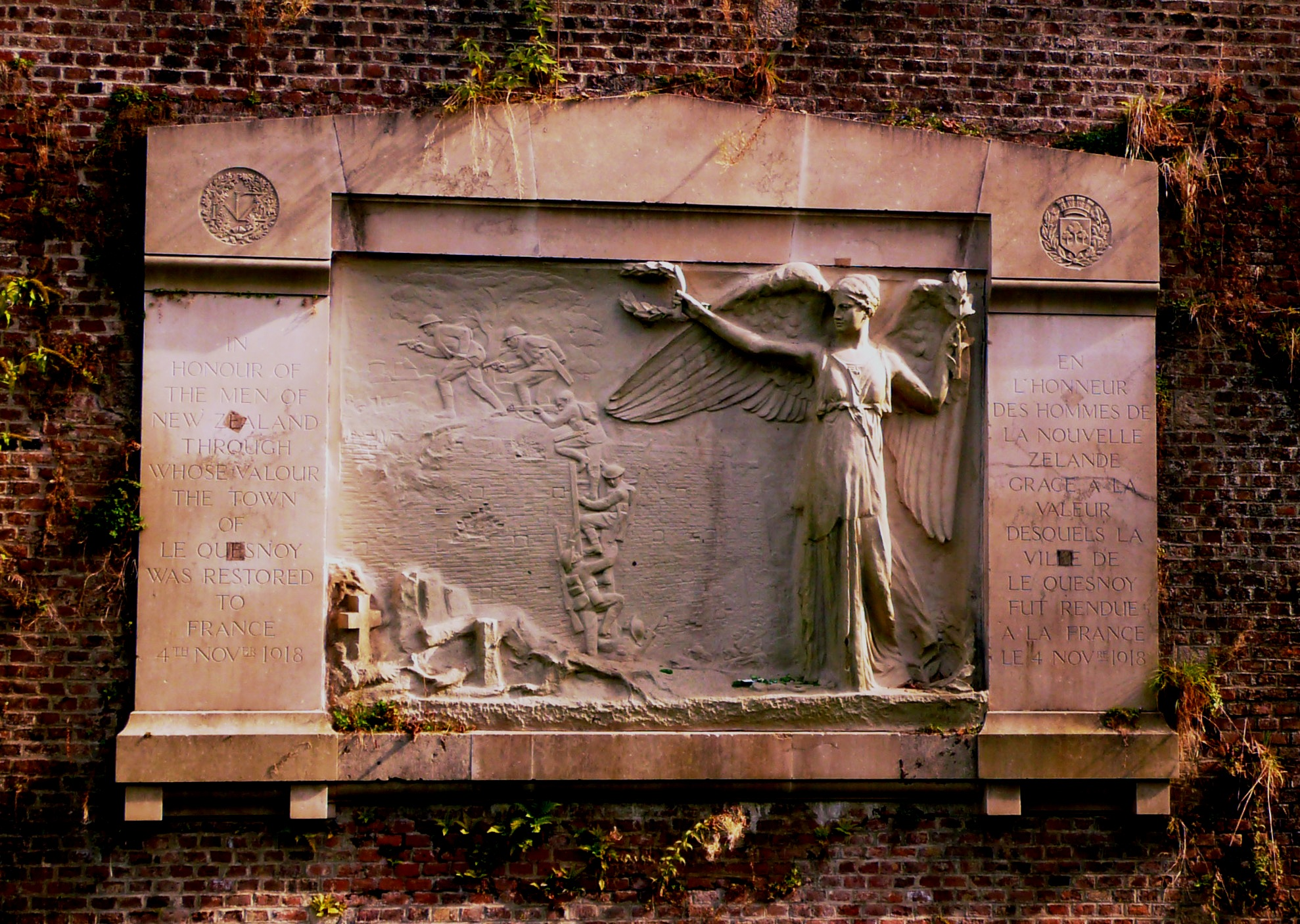
The Le Quesnoy Memorial. The relief depicts New Zealanders scaling the Le Quesnoy walls.

=== Memorial to the 1914 Christmas Truce ===
The British Army that held the front from the south of Ypres to the La Bassée canal was, in late December 1914, composed of what remained of the units which had been decimated in the First Battle of Ypres the month before. Life in the trenches was still very primitive and, with the onset of winter and the rain causing many trenches to be waterlogged, extremely demanding. The narrowness of "No man's land" in this sector of the front, just a few dozen metres, created a strange proximity between the warring parties. Small-scale, but bloody, attacks carried out in the vicinity of Ypres and French Flanders during the month of December 1914 gave way, in some sectors of the front, to spontaneous truces, in particular for the recovery of the wounded and dead lying in the mud of no man's land. On 24 December 1914, some German soldiers erected Christmas trees, complete with candles and paper lanterns, on the parapets of various first line trenches. Christmas hymns were soon being sung on both sides and soldiers even called out to each other across the front. Similar but much larger events took place on Christmas Day. In some places the warring sides buried their dead at the same time, and some even exchanged little presents, and home addresses, while in other sectors the fighting continued to rage, mostly due to sniper activity. In the British sector the truce was observed by many units at Houplines, Bois-Grenier, Fromelles, Neuve-Chapelle and Richebourg-l'Avoué. The small village of Frelinghien is situated on the Franco-Belgian frontier just to the north east of Armentieres and a memorial to the Christmas Truce is situated in Frelinghien Park opposite their football ground. There were a number of unofficial truces held along the line that day though the commands of both sides issued orders against fraternisation.

== Sector 1: Fromelles (Fleurbaix), Aubers, Neuve Chapelle and Festubert ==
South from Armentières was the front line dominated by the Aubers Ridge. The German army held this ridge, so much of the fighting in the sector involved attempts to dislodge them from it.

"South of the Armentières sector lies Aubers Ridge, a belt of country about 3 miles deep and 9 miles long. No extended periods of fighting devastated this ridge; but by shielding the important French town of Lille and German communications and supply hubs, it was always a potential setting for a major British offensive, The ridge itself, barely rising 50 feet above the plain was hardly an outstanding topographical feature in peacetime; in war, however, it totally dominated the terrain to the north and west. It was to be the scene of several British struggles in 1915– and the site of a tragic failure the following year.".

=== The Australian Memorial Park at Fromelles and the Battle of Fromelles 19 to 20 July 1916 ===
The Australian Memorial Park is situated around the remains of German fortifications on the part of the German line captured by the 14th Australian Brigade and held overnight from 19 to 20 July 1916. The park and the nearby VC Corner Cemetery lies some 3 kilometres (1.9 mi) from Fromelles, 15 feet (4.6 m) south of Armentières, and 16 kilometres (9.9 mi) west of Lille.

The work entitled Cobbers sculpted by the Melbourne sculptor Peter Corlett is located here. Corlett based his sculpture on 3101 Sergeant Simon Fraser of the 57th Battalion, a 40-year-old farmer from Victoria who had rescued many men from the battlefield. Corlett depicts him carrying a man of the 60th Battalion. Fraser was "mentioned in despatches" on a later occasion when he was a Lieutenant with the 58th Battalion. He was killed at Bullecourt on 12 May 1917. He has no known grave and his name appears on the Villers-Bretonneux Memorial. In a letter written on 31 July 1916 Fraser wrote

"It was no light work getting in with a heavy weight on your back especially if he had a broken leg or arm...You had to lie down and get him on your back; then rise and duck for your life with a chance of getting a bullet in you before you were safe. One foggy morning... we could hear someone over towards the German entanglements calling for a stretcher bearer; it was an appeal no man could stand against, so some of us rushed out and had a hunt. We found a fine haul of wounded and brought them in; but it was not where I heard this fellow calling, so I had another shot for it, and came across a splendid specimen of humanity trying to wriggle into a trench with a big wound in his thigh...another man about 30 yards out sang out "Don't forget me, cobber". I went in and got four volunteers with stretchers and we got both men in safely".

The Battle of Fromelles or Fleurbaix was a bloody affair and in a twenty-seven-hour period the Australian 5th Division suffered 5,533 casualties, with 1,917 killed, of whom 1,299 could not be identified. A further approximately 400 men were taken prisoner. To illustrate the extent of the losses the 60th Battalion Victoria Regiment started the battle with 887 men and, when the fighting was over, had just 1 officer and 106 men left. It is also estimated that the British Army had 1,547 men killed or wounded and that the German Army lost 1,500 soldiers killed or wounded in the Battle of Fromelles.

The attack at Fromelles was planned as a diversionary attack to the north of the battle raging on the Somme. Fromelles had already seen action in 1915 when British efforts to take Aubers Ridge had been repulsed with heavy losses. The Fromelles attack in 1916 saw the baptism of the Australian Imperial Force to fighting on the Western Front as the units then down on the Somme had yet to be committed to action. As was to be the case at the Somme, the provisional artillery bombardment at Fromelles did not cut the German barbed wire as hoped would be the case, and the German machine guns, with a clear view of the attackers, were able to wreak havoc once the infantry launched their attack.

One hundred metres from Memorial Park and its tribute to the courage of the Australian Cobber lies the VC Corner Australian Cemetery which was established after the Armistice of 1918. The plaque reads

"In honour of 410 unknown Australian soldiers here buried who were among the following 1,299 officers and men of the Australian Imperial Force killed in the attack at Fromelles July 19th/20th July"

It consists of two mass graves covered with immaculate lawns and marked with a cross. The graves contain the remains of more than 400 Australian soldiers who were killed in the Battle of Fromelles but who could not be identified. Immediately the war ended, Australians went back to Fromelles.

"We found the old No-Man's Land simply full of our dead. In the narrow sector west of the Laies River and east of the sugar-loaf Salient, the skulls and bones and torn uniforms were lying about everywhere."

=== Further images of the "Cobbers" memorial ===
Below are some photographs of the "Cobber" memorial, and V C Corner.

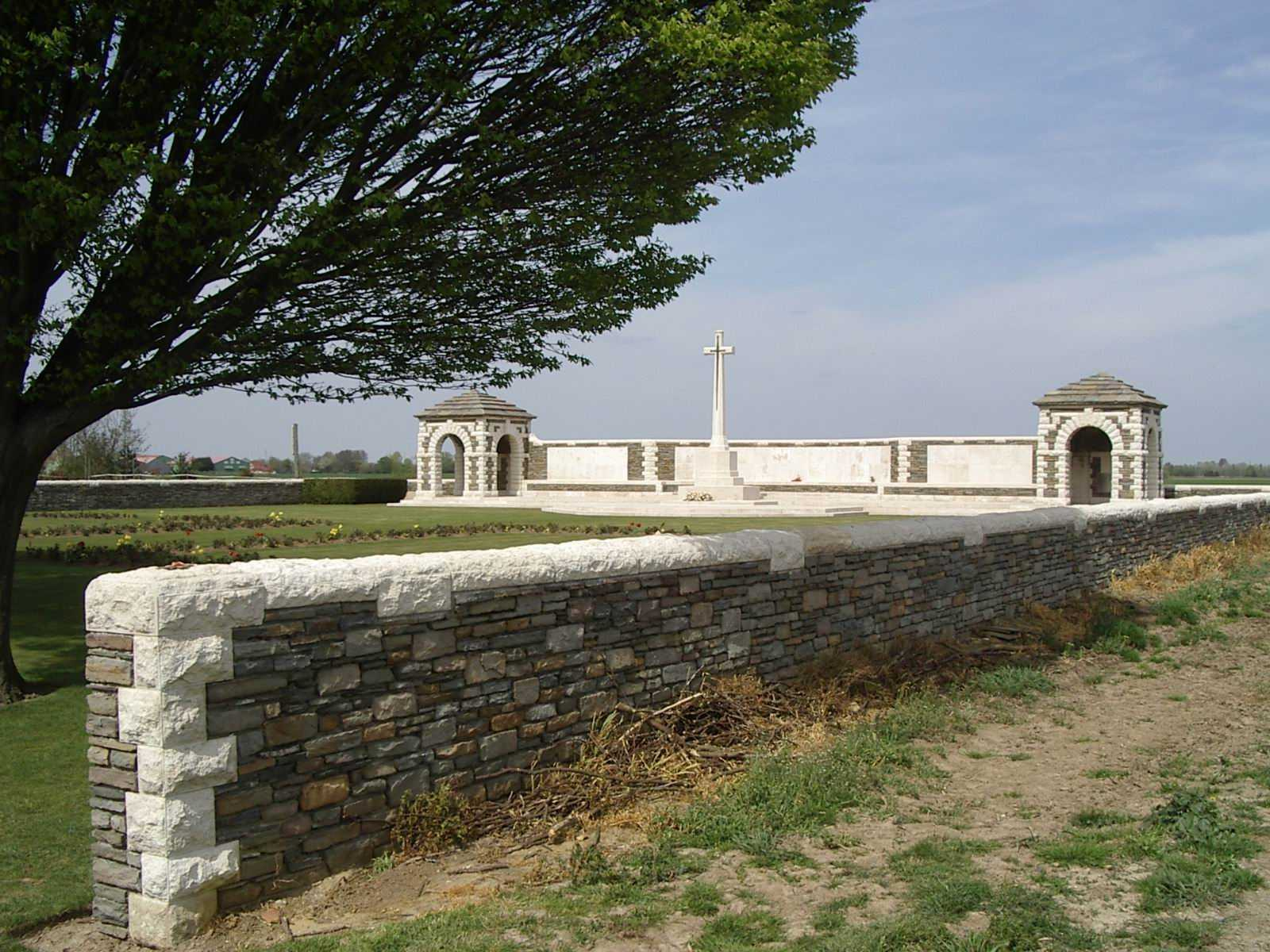
View of VC Corner Cemetery

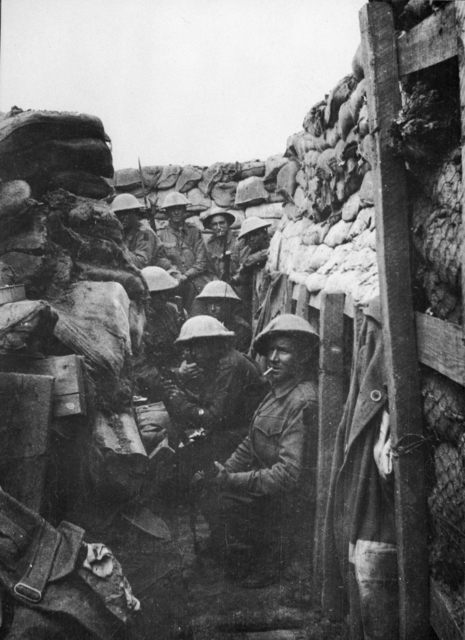
Men of the Australian 53rd Battalion photographed in the trenches at Fromelles

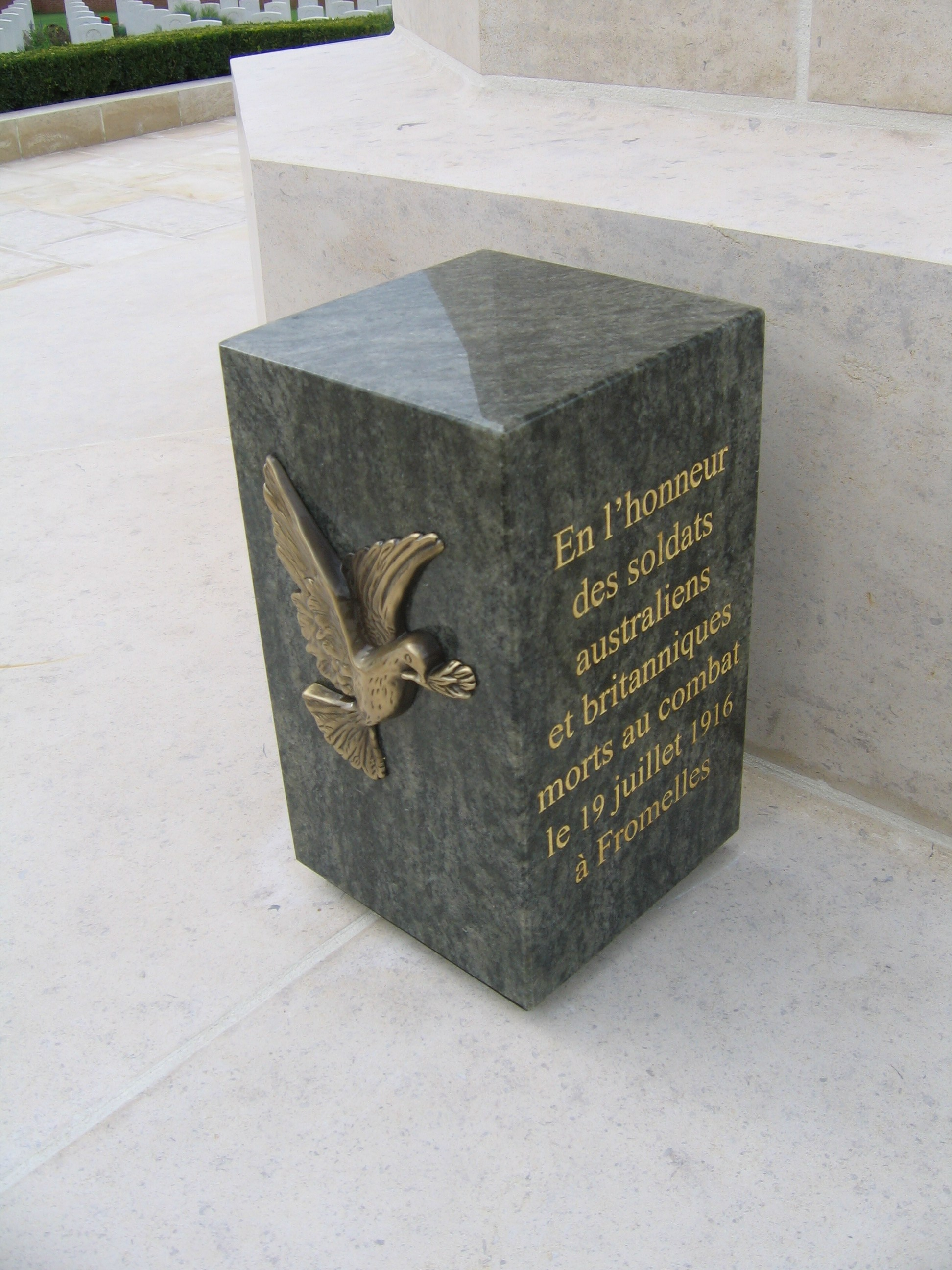
An inscribed stone at the base of the Cross of Sacrifice at Fromelles (Pheasant Wood) Military Cemetery

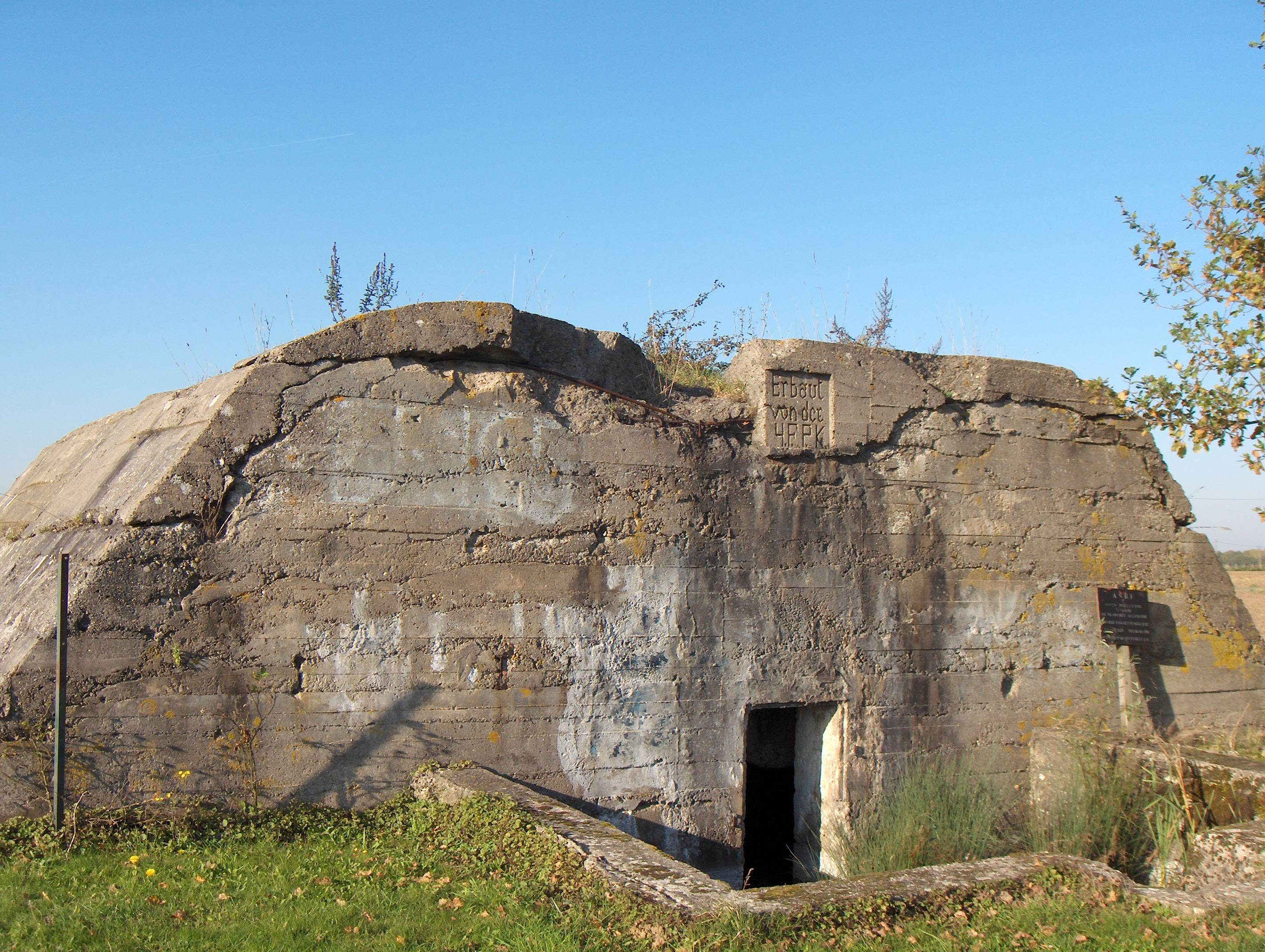
This photograph of a German blockhouse at Fromelles shows just how formidable the German fortifications were.

=== Neuve-Chapelle Indian Memorial- The Battle of Neuve Chapelle March 1915 ===
Neuve Chapelle is located some 5 kilometres (3.1 mi) north of La Bassée and 20 kilometres (12 mi) west-south-west of Lille. The Neuve-Chapelle Indian Memorial at Richebourg, near Neuve Chapelle, commemorates over 4,700 Indian soldiers and labourers who lost their lives on the Western Front during the First World War and have no known graves. It was designed by Sir Herbert Baker. The location of the memorial was specially chosen as it was at Neuve Chapelle in March 1915 that the Indian Corps fought its first major action as a single unit. The memorial takes the form of a sanctuary enclosed within a circular wall after the manner of the enclosing railings of early Indian shrines. The column in the enclosure's foreground stands almost 15 feet (4.6 m) high and was inspired by the famous inscribed columns erected by the Emperor Ashkora throughout India in the 3rd century BC. The column is surmounted with a Lotus capital, the Imperial British Crown, and the Star of India. Two tigers are carved on either side of the column guarding the temple of the dead. On the lower part of the column the words 'God is One, He is the Victory' are inscribed in English, with similar texts in Arabic, Hindi, and Gurmukhi. The tigers are the work of the sculptor Charles Wheeler. The memorial was unveiled by the Earl of Birkenhead on 7 October 1927. Lord Birkenhead, then Secretary of State for India, had served as a staff officer with the Indian Corps during the war. The ceremony was also attended by the Maharaja of Karputhala, Marshal Ferdinand Foch, Rudyard Kipling, and a large contingent of Indian veterans. An inscription on the wall reads

"To the honour of the army of India which fought in France and Belgium, 1914–1918, and in perpetual remembrance of those of their dead whose names are here recorded and those who have no known grave."

The Indian Army made a huge contribution to the Great War. Their involvement on the Western Front was limited in the main to the years 1914 and 1915 and after this, in recognition of the difficulties for Indians to live and operate in the grim climatic conditions of Northern Europe, they were moved to the Egyptian Theatre of War and other warmer places. India, in the context of the 1914–1918 war, was pre-partition India; the Indian Sub-Continent in 1914 would have embraced present day India, Pakistan, Kashmir, Nepal and Bangladesh. Only days after the British government had declared war on Germany on 4 August 1914, two infantry divisions and a cavalry brigade of the Indian Army were ordered to mobilise and prepare for overseas service. Units began arriving in France in September 1914, and by late October they were involved in heavy fighting on the Messines Ridge in Belgium. It was at Messines on 31 October 1914 that Khudadad Khan performed the act of gallantry for which he was later awarded the Victoria Cross, becoming the first Indian born soldier to be so honoured. The Indian Corps, which was composed of the 3rd (Lahore) and 7th (Meerut) divisions, went on to fight in some of the bloodiest battles of the first year of the war, and at the Battle of Neuve Chapelle which ran from 10 to 13 March 1915. Indian soldiers made up half of the attacking force and, despite suffering very heavy casualties, succeeded in capturing important sections of the German line. The officers and men of the Corps further distinguished themselves at St. Julien in the Ypres Salient in April 1915, at Aubers Ridge and Festubert in May of that year, and at Loos in September 1915, before they were redeployed to the Middle East in December. The Indian Cavalry Corps remained on the Western Front until the spring of 1918 and Indian labour companies, which had begun arriving in France in 1917, performed vital and often dangerous logistical work behind the lines until after the Armistice. India sent over 140,000 men to the Western Front – 90,000 serving in the infantry and cavalry and as many as 50,000 non-combatant labourers. They hailed from the length and breadth of British India: from the Punjab, Garwahl, the Frontiers, Bengal, Nepal, Madras, and Burma, and represented an extremely diverse range of religious, linguistic, and ethnic cultures. The officer corps was composed mostly of men of European descent. Of the combatants, over 8,550 were killed and as many as 50,000 more were wounded. Almost 5,000 of the dead have no known grave and are commemorated both on the Menin Gate at Ypres and here at Neuve Chapelle.

In 1964, a Special Bronze Panel was added to this memorial with the names of 210 servicemen who died during the 1914–1918 war, whose graves at Zehrensdorf Indian Cemetery, Germany, had become unmaintainable. Although this plaque still exists, the graves were reinstated in 2005. This site also contains the Neuve-Chapelle 1939–1945 Cremation Memorial. In 1964, the remains of 8 Indian soldiers (including 2 unidentified) were exhumed from Sarrebourg French Military Cemetery Extension and cremated. The names of the 6 identified soldiers are engraved on panels at the Neuve Chapelle Memorial along with the following inscription

"1939 – In honour of these soldiers who died in captivity in North-West Europe and whose mortal remains were committed to fire"

File WO 32/5878 held at The National Archives in Kew provides further background information on the memorial. This file also covers the memorials to the Indian Army which it was proposed be erected in Mesopotamia, Egypt, Gallipoli and East Africa. The file notes that amongst those remembered at Neuve Chapelle is the Victoria Cross winner, Rifleman Gobar Sing Negi. One interesting point to arise from the National Archive file is a letter from Army Headquarters in Simla dated 26 June 1919. This includes the following

" I may mention that we propose to erect war memorials in villages which have given most men to the Army. These will be selected by Local Governments, on the advice of their local Recruiting Boards, based on the statistics in their possession. In the Punjab, about 130 villages will be so honoured. In other Provinces the number will be less, but in the United Provinces and the N.W.Frontier Province it will be fairly big"

=== Aubers Ridge and Festubert ===
It was on 24 March 1915, several days after the failed offensive at Neuve-Chapelle, that General Joffre made an official request for the British Army to take part in a huge offensive he was planning in Artois at the beginning of May. The aim of the offensive was to break through the German line north of Arras. The main thrust of the attack was to be made by the 10th French Army on Vimy Ridge and two supporting attacks on the flanks would, it was hoped, secure the heights of Lorette Spur to the north-west and other high ground to the east of Arras. If everything went according to plan the French hoped that they would be able to advance into the coal basin itself and take Douai.

In this context the British fought two battles, that at Aubers Ridge and at Festubert, both fought in May 1915, and both to distract the German's from Joffre's main attack.

Neither battle achieved the results hoped for and huge casualties were sustained- it reportedly took three days to transfer the wounded of 9 May to the field ambulances on the second line. In one single day of fighting the British Army had lost 11,000 men (dead, wounded and lost in action) which was, in relative terms, one of the highest casualty rates of the Great War, in particular for officers. The memorial at Le Touret remembers those who died at Aubers and Festubert and have no known grave.

=== Memorial to the 15th Battalion Canadian Infantry ===
There is a commemorative plaque located just a kilometre to the east of Festubert which marks the efforts in this area of the 15th Battalion Canadian Infantry during the Battle of Festubert which opened on 15 May 1915.

Following the German gas attack in the Ypres Salient in April 1915, the depleted Battalions of the Canadian 1st Division were reinforced and moved to France south of Armentières. On 18 May the Canadian 3rd Brigade, was called up from Reserve and moved into the line east of Festubert, joining a series of assaults around a German strong point called the Orchard. The 14th Battalion (Royal Montreal Regiment), 16th (The Canadian Scottish Regiment) and the 15th Battalion (48th Highlanders of Canada) all played a significant part in the fighting.

When the battle was called off on 25 May, the line established by the advances of the 15th and 16th Battalions remained the front line until 1918. The Canadian 1st Division suffered 2,468 casualties and the 15th Battalion lost 150 men. The fallen of the 15th Battalion lie buried in: Aire Communal, Arras Road, Béthune, Cabaret Rouge, Étaples, Guards (Cuinchy), Hinges, Le Touquet and Pont-de-Hem Cemeteries and the Missing are commemorated on the Vimy Memorial. The commemorative plaque was unveiled on 23 October 2011 in the presence of Canadian and French dignitaries by members of the 15th Battalion Memorial Project.

=== Le Touret Memorial and Le Touret Military Cemetery ===
The Le Touret Memorial, which lies between Béthune and Armentiéres, commemorates over 13,400 British soldiers who were killed in this sector of the Western Front from the beginning of October 1914 to the eve of the Battle of Loos in late September 1915 and who have no known grave. The Memorial takes the form of a loggia surrounding an open rectangular court. The names of those commemorated are listed on panels set into the walls of the court and the gallery, these are arranged by regiment, rank, and alphabetically by surname within the rank. The memorial was designed by John Reginald Truelove, who had served as an officer with the London Regiment during the war, and was unveiled by the British ambassador to France, Lord Tyrrell, on 22 March 1930. Almost all of the men commemorated on the Memorial served with regular or territorial regiments from across the United Kingdom and were killed in actions that took place along a section of the front line that stretched from Estaires in the north to Grenay in the south. This part of the Western Front was the scene of some of the heaviest fighting of the first years of the war, including: the Battle of La Bassée fought from 10 October to 2 November 1914, Battle of Neuve Chapelle fought from 10 to 12 March 1915, Battle of Aubers Ridge fought from 9 to 10 May 1915, and Battle of Festubert fought from 15 to 25 May 1915. Soldiers serving with Indian and Canadian units who were killed in this sector in 1914 and 1915 whose remains were never identified, are commemorated on the Neuve Chapelle and Vimy memorials, while those who fell during the northern pincer attack at the Battle of Aubers Ridge are commemorated on the Ploegsteert Memorial to the Missing.

=== The Portuguese Cemetery and Memorial at Neuve Chapelle and the memorial at La Couture ===
On the same road as the Indian Memorial is the Portuguese and their cemetery at Richebourg. On 9 April 1918 the German Army launched Operation Georgette in the Lys Valley in the hope of a decisive victory before the arrival of further American reinforcements. In three successive waves, ten divisions overwhelmed the two Portuguese divisions which were incomplete, badly organized, and taken by surprise as they were in the process of being relieved. Portuguese losses amounted to 7,500 men on that day. On the next day, along with the Scottish, the survivors defended La Couture near Béthune before eventually being forced to retreat. The Germans took Estaires, Armentières and Bailleul but failed to take Béthune and Hazebrouck. Operation Georgette was called off on 29 April 1918. The Portuguese had suffered heavy casualties in this action and the bodies of many of the men killed were beyond identification. 239 of the graves at Richebourg are marked with the Portuguese word Desconhecido ("unknown"). The site of the cemetery/memorial takes up both sides of the road and on one side there is a chapel dedicated to Our Lady of Fatima and on the other side, behind an entrance and a wrought-iron gate, is the Portuguese National Cemetery, the final resting place of 1,831 soldiers.

In 1916, the young Portuguese Republic had entered the war on the side of the Allies. The Portuguese Expeditionary Force comprised up to 56,500 men and, under the command of the British Army, was assigned to Flanders and positioned in the trenches between the villages of Laventie and Festubert. The Portuguese Command took up quarters in Peylouse Manor in Saint-Venant.

In honour of the soldiers who defended the village of La Couture, the French and Portuguese governments inaugurated a monument there in 1928. The monument's frieze shows the ruins of a Gothic church and an allegory of the Portuguese Republic coming to the aid of one of its soldiers.

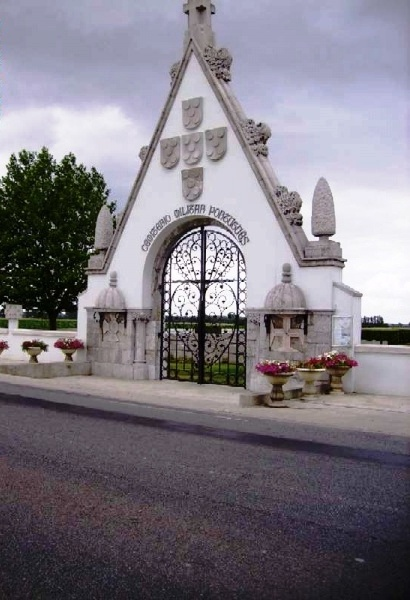
The entrance to the Portuguese Cemetery at Richebourg

== Sector 2. Artois: From La Bassée and Béthune to Lens ==
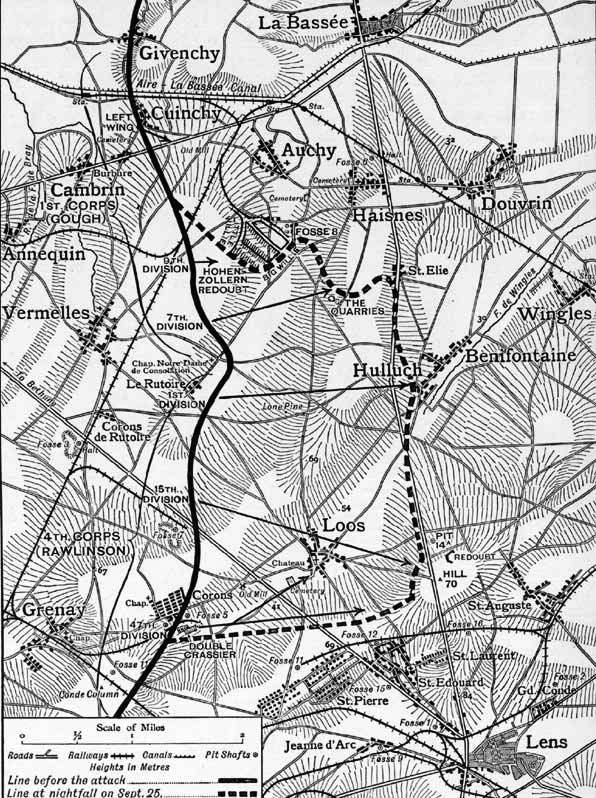
Map of Battle of Loos

=== Dud Corner Cemetery, the Loos Memorial, and the Battle of Loos ===
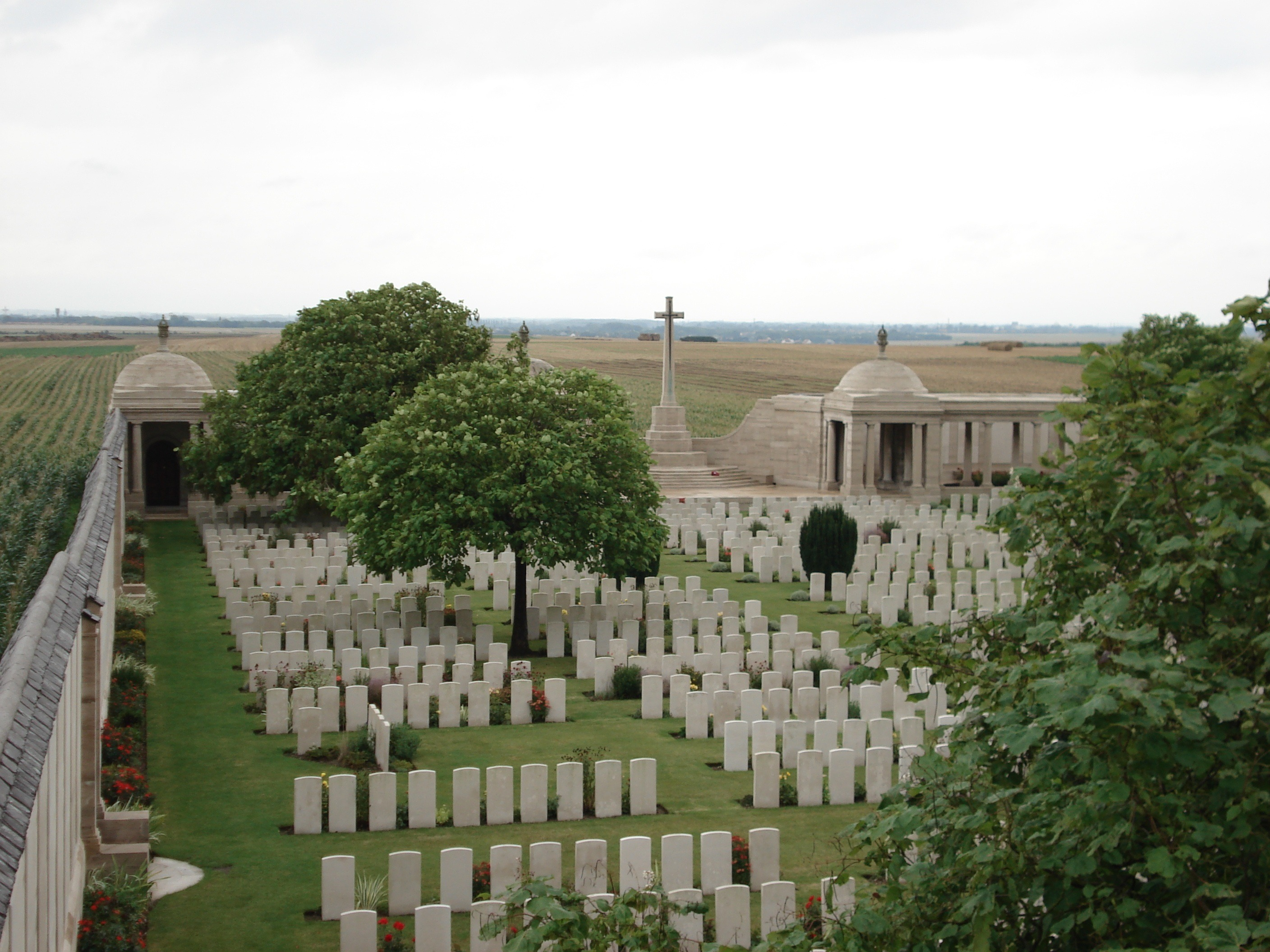
View of Dud Corner Cemetery, with the Loos Memorial seen at the rear

In the autumn of 1915, the British High Command had little enthusiasm for another major offensive but the French were quite insistent on one. Joffre's plans involved a two-pronged attack. The French Army was to launch a major attack in the Champagne area and a Franco-Commonwealth attack was planned on a 32 kilometres (20 mi) line to the north of Arras. Of this 32-kilometre stretch the British were allocated a 10 kilometres (6.2 mi) section running from Givenchy just north of the La Bassée Canal and the industrial town of Bully-Grenay in front of Lens; the Gohelle Battlefields.

One reason for Haig and French's lack of enthusiasm was that they did not feel that they had fully absorbed the lessons of Second Ypres, Festubert, Neuve Chapelle and Aubers Ridge, the earlier offensives of 1915 and the doomed Gallipoli campaign had diverted precious men and munitions from the Western Front. However, their major concern was that the levels of ammunition available would not support a major offensive as the initial advances by the infantry would have to be supported by a high degree of artillery fire. The French demand was however met and the British Army allocated the 10 kilometre sector mentioned earlier. At this battle the British intended to make their first use of gas and the offensive would give Kitchener's "New Army" a chance to show their mettle.

In fact the offensive failed both in the Champagne and at Loos and the Loos Memorial at Loos-en-Gohelle commemorates the 20,605 British officers and men who were killed from 25 September 1915 to the end of the war in November 1918 in the little sector between the river Lys in French Flanders and the village of Grenay, near Lens, in Artois. The Loos memorial forms the rear and two sides of Dud Corner Cemetery, so called because of the high number of unexploded shells found there.

The thousands of names of the servicemen missing in action with no known grave are inscribed on 139 stone panels attached to these side and rear walls. The Loos Memorial was designed by Sir Herbert Baker with sculpture by Charles Wheeler. Stone tablets containing the names of the missing are numbered from 1 to 139, starting at the north-west corner of the memorial and running around the walls to the south-west corner. It was unveiled by Sir Nevil Macready on 4 August 1930.

The Battle of Loos had opened on 25 September 1915. The 9th (Scottish) Division scored one of the few successes by gaining a foothold on the Hohenzollern Redoubt and Fosse 8, the main observation posts used by the Germans to view the area and the 15th (Scottish) took Loos and pushed on to the Hill 70 Redoubt. However, the gains, won at such a horrific loss of life, had to be capitalized on quickly and the reserves (mostly inexperienced New Army Divisions) were brought into action too slowly. The Germans counter-attacked and by 27 September the offensive was breaking down and the Germans had retaken both the Hohenzollern Redoubt and Fosse 8. Attempts to retake these important positions were made on 13 October 1915, but failed after further heavy losses and by 19 October 1915, the battle petered to a halt. The British Army had lost over 20,000 men.

Field Marshal Sir John French, already being criticised before the battle, lost his remaining support in both the Government and Army as a result of the British failure at Loos and his perceived poor handling of his reserve divisions in the battle. He was replaced by Douglas Haig as Commander of the British Expeditionary Force in December 1915.

The first use of gas by the British had not been a success but Kitchener's New Army had at least been "bloodied" and in every sense of the word. It has been estimated that more than 14,000 of those named on the walls of the Loos Memorial died in the Battle of Loos and that of the 8,500 who died on the first day, over 6,500 were to have no known grave.

Among the dead on the British side at Loos were: Fergus Bowes-Lyon, brother to Elizabeth Bowes-Lyon (later Queen Consort, of George VI and "Queen Mother"), author and poet Rudyard Kipling's son, John, and the poet Charles Sorley.

"Loos was the fourth failure of 1915 for the British and this time losses reached almost 48,000 men; at Vimy the French figure was almost identical. In the wider Artois offensive the total was 143,567.".

No further attacks were to take place in the Gohelle, Vimy and Arras sectors until the spring of 1917.

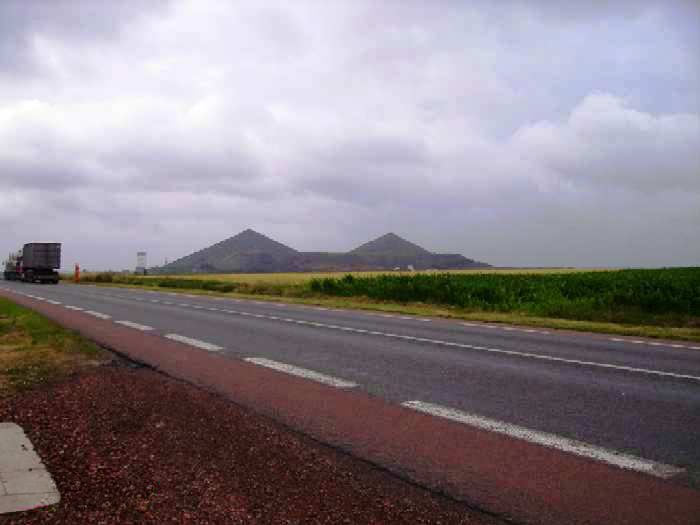
View of slag-heaps near Loos Memorial. These slag-heaps are called crassiers in French.

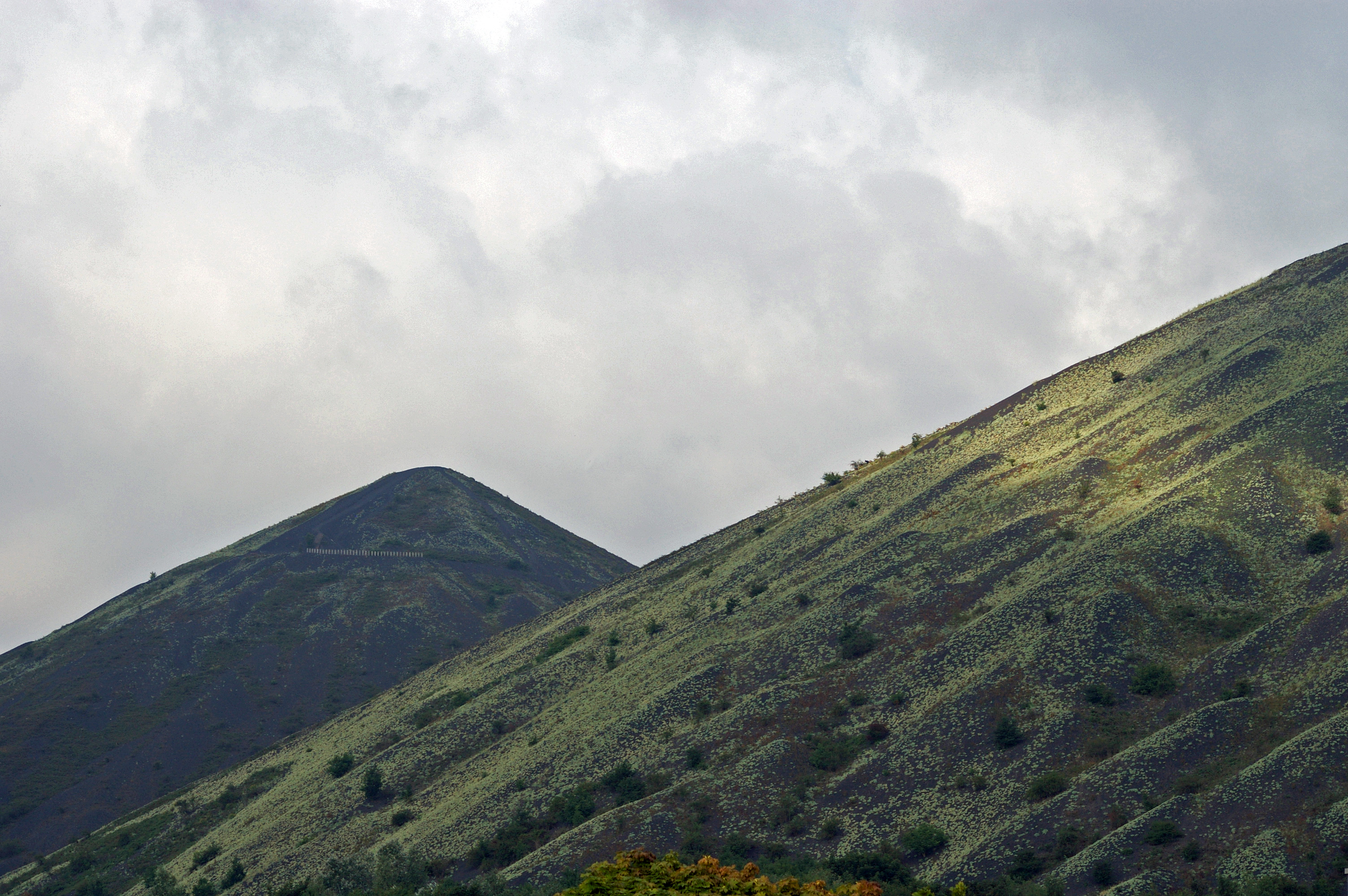
View of slag-heaps or crassiers. Also called terrils in French.

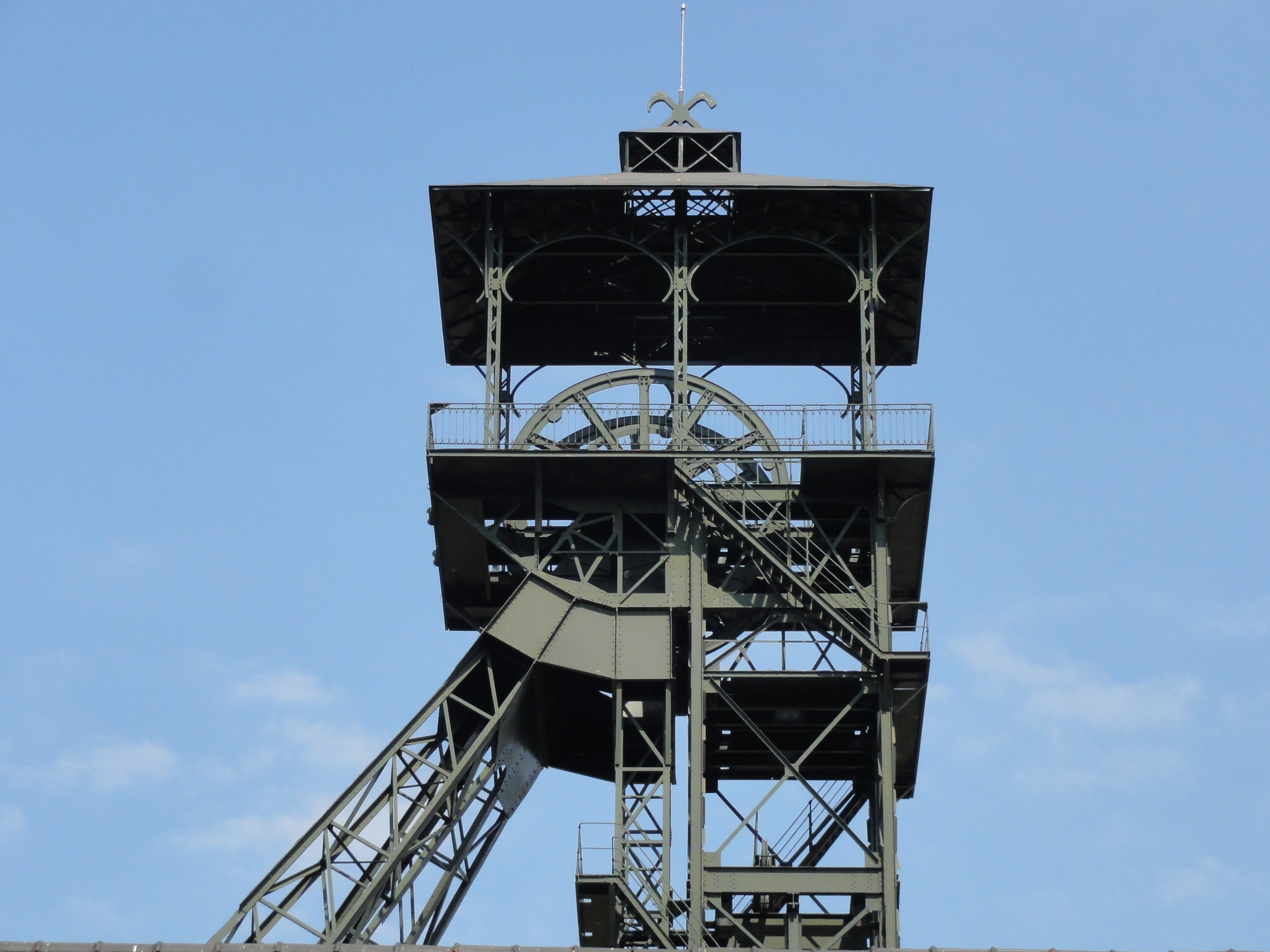
A fosse in the Loos area. Fosse is the French word for a coal-mine.

=== Memorial to the 55th (West Lancashire) Division at Givenchy-lès-la-Bassée. "They win or die. Who wear the rose of Lancaster" ===
Givenchy-lès-la-Bassée is a village some 27 kilometres (17 mi) north of Arras and about 5 kilometres (3.1 mi) west of La Bassée and the memorial to the 55th (West Lancashire) Division near to the Givenchy Communal Cemetery. It was here in April 1918 that the 55th (West Lancashire) Division defended the village against three German Divisions. In April 1918, the German 6th Army launched the second part of General Ludendorff's strategic plan to win the war before the weight of the rapidly expanding American Army could be brought fully into action. Originally named George, it was later renamed Georgette. The encounter that followed is known as the Battle of the Lys. The German attack commenced on 9 April 1918 and the 55th (West Lancashire) Division in front of Givenchy and the 2nd Portuguese Division at Neuve Chapelle took the blunt of the attack.

Because this sector of the front had been in British hands for years, the various zones of combat forming the 1918 styled defence system was far better prepared than that of Gough's Fifth Army (who had taken over an unprepared position from the French). However, the Portuguese were suspected to be capable of offering only a weak resistance and the British 40th Division (in front of Fromelles) and 34th Division at Armentières had both been badly mauled in Operation Michael on the Somme only weeks beforehand.

The Lancashire Territorials of the 55th Division found themselves confronted by the 4th Ersatz, 43rd Reserve and 18th Reserve Infantry Divisions on their own front while their immediate left flank was rapidly pushed in by the 1st Bavarian Reserve Division following the faster than anticipated collapse of the Portuguese 2nd Division. As the Germans pushed in and around them the Lancashire men fell back to their line of resistance along the road to Windy Corner, mounted counterattacks, and remained. The front by the following day looped around the top of Festubert and then turned north-west towards Locon. On 11 April, a second attempt was made to break the 55th Division but apart from a few hundred metres on its far left the assault by four German Divisions was repulsed. Having made greater gains to the north around Merville and the Belgian border, the Germans began to concentrate their efforts in those areas. Ultimately their offensive would fail. The defenders of Givenchy had not ceded a metre.

The memorial itself is a 30 feet (9.1 m)-high granite cross standing in a small park near Givenchy-lès-la-Bassée Communal Cemetery. The memorial includes the words

"They win or die. Who wear the rose of Lancaster"

and records part of Sir Douglas Haig's Despatch of 20 July 1918

"Around this site from the 9th to the 16th April 1918 the Division, continuously attacked from the canal to Festubert by three German Divisions and with its left flank turned held its ground and inflicted severe loss upon the enemy, This most gallant defence, the importance of which it would be hard to overestimate"

File WO 32/5870 held at The National Archives in Kew covers the memorial at Givenchy to the 55th Division and indicates that the Memorial was unveiled on 15 May 1921 by Joffre. See also

=== Memorial to Lieutenant Hillyar Hill-Trevor ===
Also at Givenchy-lès-la-Bassée is a memorial to Lieutenant Hillyar Hill-Trevor of the 1st Battalion of the Scots Guards who was killed in action on 21 December 1914. He has no known grave and is one of those named on the Le Touret Memorial. Hillyar George Edwin Hill-Trevor was the only son of the Hon. George Edwyn Hill-Trevor and his wife and a grandson of the first Lord Trevor of Chirk, North Wales. He was a direct descendant of Arthur, Duke of Wellington. The memorial stands on a carved base, set in a large curbed surround filled with granite chippings. The top of the column is inscribed

"For God and Country"

, and across the base is written

"Thine O God he was and thine he is in perfect we leave him till we meet again"

and on the centre of the base

"Close to this spot sleeps in eternal peace Hillyar George Edwin Hill-Trevor Lt Scots Guards beloved only child of the Honble George Edwyn & Ethel Hill-Trevor of Brynkinalt Chirk Wales killed while gallantly leading his men Dec 21 1914 Aged 18 years"

The memorial is cared for by the Commonwealth War Graves Commission. The sculptor of the memorial was William Reid Dick who provided much of the sculpture on the Menin Gate and was responsible for the Arras Flying Services Memorial. The female figure is a copy of that which he used for the Bushey War Memorial in England.

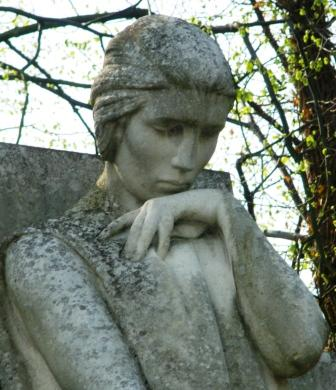
Female figure on Bushey War Memorial used for Hill-Trevor's memorial

=== The Tunnelers' Memorial at Givenchy-lès-la-Bassée ===
This particular area lent itself to the digging of tunnels and both sides waged a "mining war".

The memorial at Givenchy-lès-la-Bassée commemorates the endeavours of the men of the Tunneling Companies of Britain, Canada, Australia and New Zealand who, during the Great War, lived, fought and died underground in France and Flanders. It was unveiled on 19 June 2010. It is erected in special remembrance of Sapper William Hackett (VC) of 254 Tunneling Company RE, and Private Thomas Collins of the 14th Battalion, The Welsh Regiment, who both still lie 40 feet (12 m) beneath the field in front of this memorial.

The memorial comprises a British Lakeland slate panel whose dimensions are those of the Shaftsbury Gallery in which William Hackett VC and Thomas Collins still lie. The words are framed by drawings of the tunnelers mining equipment – including canaries and mice. The circular base is the same diameter as the Shaftsbury Shaft by which the tunnelers descended into the gallery. William Hackett is commemorated on the Ploegsteert Memorial in Belgium while Thomas Collins is listed on the Thiepval Memorial.

=== 58th French Infantry Division ===
This monument is situated on the D 941 between Cambrin and Auchy les Mines. The 58e Division d'Infanterie were a Reserve Infantry Division and arrived in Cuinchy on 16 October 1914. The Germans had occupied a position along the Vermelles – Violaines Road opposite them. On the northern side of the canal was the British II Corps (later the Indian Corps). A constant run of battles was taking place trying to secure La Bassée and Givenchy with the British and French fighting side by side for much of the time. In these early months of the war the line was still fluid without real trenches and the French managed to advance their line by 700 metres (770 yd). Over the next few days the Germans launched numerous counter-attacks; despite heavy losses the French held the line. As a result of these constant assaults in both directions, the first trenches were constructed in the area, though the word is used loosely because with a very high water table the trenches tended to be built up rather than dug down. On 12 November 1914 the Division received a citation

"Cette division a toujours été en première ligne, a gagné du terrain et n'en a jamais perdu, malgré de fortes pertes et des attaques violentes de l'ennemi"

("This division has always been in the front line, has gained ground and never lost, despite heavy losses and violent attacks by the enemy.")

The 58th Infantry remained responsible for this sector of the line throughout the winter of 1914/1915. Alongside them were soldiers of the 141e régiment d'infanterie territorial (141st Territorial Regiment – made up of older soldiers who had already finished their term in the Reserve) of the 92e Division Territoriale. The Memorial was inaugurated on 31 August 1924. t comprises a block of granite surmounted by a French Army Adrian Helmet. The inscription on the memorial reads

"A la mémoire des braves de la 58e division morts pour la France"

("In memory of the brave men of the 58th Division who died for France".)

and on the sides are listed the units which made up the Division: 295th, 285th, 256th et 281st Infantry and the 141st Territorials.

=== Memorial to the 1st King Edward's Horse at Vieille Chapelle ===
This memorial is located in Vieille Chapelle New Military Cemetery and honours the 1st King Edward's Horse, who defended the village in April 1918. File WO 32/5854 held at The National Archives covers the memorial and the period 1919 to 1922. King Edward's Horse suffered 150 casualties in forming a new front where the Portuguese line had broken. In WO 32/5854 is the information that the plot of land upon which the memorial stands had been offered to the regiment by the commune of Vielle Chapelle. Many New Zealanders perished at Vieille Chapelle and in the file is a cutting from the Otago Daily Times of 28 March 1921 which recorded the ceremony held when the first stone of the memorial was laid.

== Sector 3 Artois: Loretto Heights and Vimy Ridge ==
The south-eastern end of the Vimy Ridge the east of the ancient city of Arras. East of Arras the front line crossed farms and villages. Arras was evacuated by French forces on 29 August 1914 but reoccupied a month later. It remained in French hands throughout the war. Underneath the city there were tunnels and catacombs dug out of the chalk by the Romans. Some were used during the First World War by medical units and as safe shelter for Allied troops. The city was destroyed by German artillery bombardments from vantage points on the high ground.

"As the boundary of the clay plain of Flanders and the chalk uplands of Artois, the Vimy Ridge and its smaller cousin Notre Dame de Lorette created a formidable military barrier, a geological fracture destined to have a deep impact on the lives of soldiers struggling for topographical advantage." In 1914, the German Army had taken both these ridges and had occupied both Loos and Lens, and it was largely as a consequence of the efforts of French Alpine divisions, and troops from Senegal, that they were kept out of Arras. Once the front line had stabilised, Arras was left at the centre of a salient and open to constant artillery bombardment from the high ground to the north and south. The French were always sought to redress this situation and after an offensive in 1914 Foch launched the Second Battle of Artois from 9 May to 19 June 1915. The Germans were driven from Notre Dame de Lorette but a major break-through was not achieved. The Vimy Ridge and beyond it Douai remained in German hands. There was however to be little respite and 1915 was to see another offensive in the area, the Battle of Loos.

South of the coalfields around Lens, the Artois landscape gently rises up in a series of finger-like spurs. Two spurs of particularly high ground allow clear visibility from all directions. These spurs lie in a north-west to south-east direction and are located north-west of the city of Arras. They are known as the Loretto Heights (Notre Dame de Lorette) and the Vimy ridge.

=== Notre Dame de Lorette and the Second Battle of Artois from 9 May to 18 June 1915 ===
Preparations for the French offensive on Notre Dame de Lorette and Vimy Ridge began on 3 May 1915 with a sustained artillery bombardment which lasted over the following six days and nights. Then at 10 a.m. on 9 May, the 33rd Army Corps under the command of General Philippe Pétain attacked a 6 kilometres (3.7 mi) section of the German front. In just a few hours the attackers succeeded in overwhelming the German trenches and advancing 3 kilometres (1.9 mi) towards Vimy Ridge; however the reserves were too far back from the front to be able to reach the front lines quickly enough to capitalize on the breakthrough, and the French artillery was unable to provide cover for its foremost troops. The Germans soon reorganized and launched a counter-attack. Fighting on the heights of Notre-Dame-de-Lorette continued for a week with savage encounters but in the end the success of the French offensive was limited: the villages of Carency and Ablain-Saint-Nazaire were taken but Vimy Ridge, and thus the control of the coal basin beyond it, remained in German hands. The human cost of this great offensive, which resulted in no major strategic gain, was enormous for the French Army: it suffered 102,000 casualties, double the losses suffered by the Germans during all the French and British attacks between Arras and Festubert.

Almost 40,000 men who were killed in the First World War are honoured in the cemetery at Notre Dame de Lorette (Cimetière militaire Notre-Dame-de-Lorette or the Nécropole nationale de Notre-Dame-de-Lorette). This French military cemetery covers 13 hectares (1,300 a). Almost 20,000 of the soldiers are buried in individual graves while the remains of 19,998 unidentified casualties were laid to rest in seven ossuaries within the cemetery grounds. These seven ossuaries contain the remains of French servicemen brought into the cemetery from the Artois battlefields including single burials, burials in civilian cemeteries and small military burial sites within a radius of some 30 miles (48 km) of Ablain St. Nazaire. It was not possible to identify these remains. The ossuaries are named after French military commanders.

Ossuaries Number 1 – 5 are located at the western end of the cemetery.

- Ossuary No. 1 named Fayolle contains 1,006 bodies
- Ossuary No. 2 named Franchet d'Esperey contains 1,892 bodies
- Ossuary No. 3 named Joffre contains 1,874 bodies
- Ossuary No. 4 named Lyautey contains 957 bodies
- Ossuary No. 5 named Pétain contains 1,029 bodies

There are another two ossuaries on the eastern side of the Lantern Tower.

- Ossuary No. 6 named Foch contains 4,563 bodies
- Ossuary No. 7 named Barbot contains 5,649 bodies

At the base of the Lantern Tower an eighth ossuary contains the remains of another 6,000 soldiers.

There is a plot at the western end of the cemetery for Muslim soldiers, and each grave has a headstone instead of a cross with each headstone facing east. North Africans from the 1st Moroccan Division fought in this area during the battles of 1915 for the high ground of Lorette and the ridge at Vimy.

General Ernest Barbot is also buried in the cemetery. He was Commander of the French 77th Mountain Division and was killed on the Artois battlefield at Souchez on 10 May 1915. This division had fought in the 1914 battles in the Alsace mountains and had been moved to Artois by early 1915. Barbot's grave marker was originally one created by his soldiers as a cross made out of shell casings retrieved from the battlefield but that cross was stolen in 1952 and was replaced with the same simple cross that marks the final resting place of so many of General Barbot's comrades in arms.

After dark the Lantern Tower sends a beacon of light across the surrounding countryside. It revolves five times each minute and it is reckoned that its ray of light covers a distance of about 45 miles (72 km). This Lantern Tower was designed by Louis Cordonnier and the first stone was laid on 19 June 1921 by Marshal Philippe Pétain. The inauguration ceremony was held on 2 August 1925. The tower is 150 feet (46 m) high with 200 steps. Until recently the tower was open to the public to climb to the stop, but now the viewing area at the top has been closed for security reasons. The base of the tower is a square with each side being 35 feet (11 m) long. At the base of the tower there is an ossuary-crypt containing the remains of 6,000 soldiers and a Chapel of Rest. There are 32 coffins located in the Chapel of Rest in four groups of 8 coffins. Three coffins contain the remains of an unknown soldier from the Second World War (laid to rest here in July 1950), a soldier from the North African war (laid to rest here in October 1977), and the remains of a soldier from the Indochina war (laid to rest here in June 1980). A reliquary (a container for relics) was placed in the tower in April 1955, which contains soil and ashes from the concentration camps of World War II. Since 1920 Notre Dame de Lorette has been manned by a Voluntary Guard of Honour which welcomes visitors to the site and rekindles the Eternal Flame every Sunday. The Basilica which stands in the cemetery was constructed in the Byzantine style and is 46 metres (50 yd) long and 14 metres (15 yd) wide. The transept is 30 metres (33 yd) long. The construction of the Basilica was inspired by Monseigneur Eugene Julien, Bishop of Arras, who wanted it dedicated to all those who had fallen in this part of France. The interior of the Basilica, a vast and colourful mosaic, contains on its walls thousands of memorial plaques to both units and individuals who lost their lives for France. Six of the windows were donated by Britain as thanks for all the land given by France for British Cemeteries.

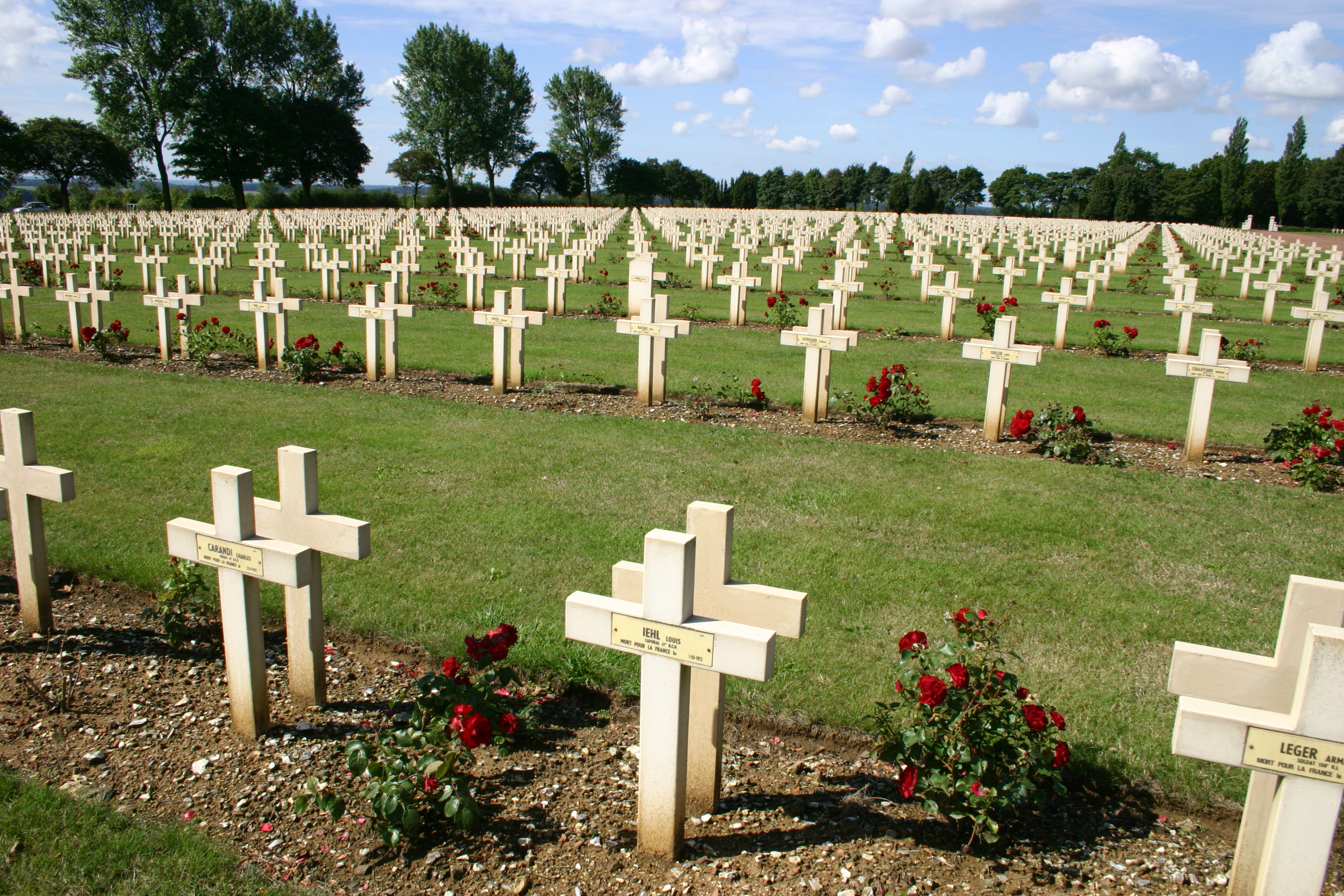
Graves at Notre Dame de Lorette

=== Images Notre Dame de Lorette ===
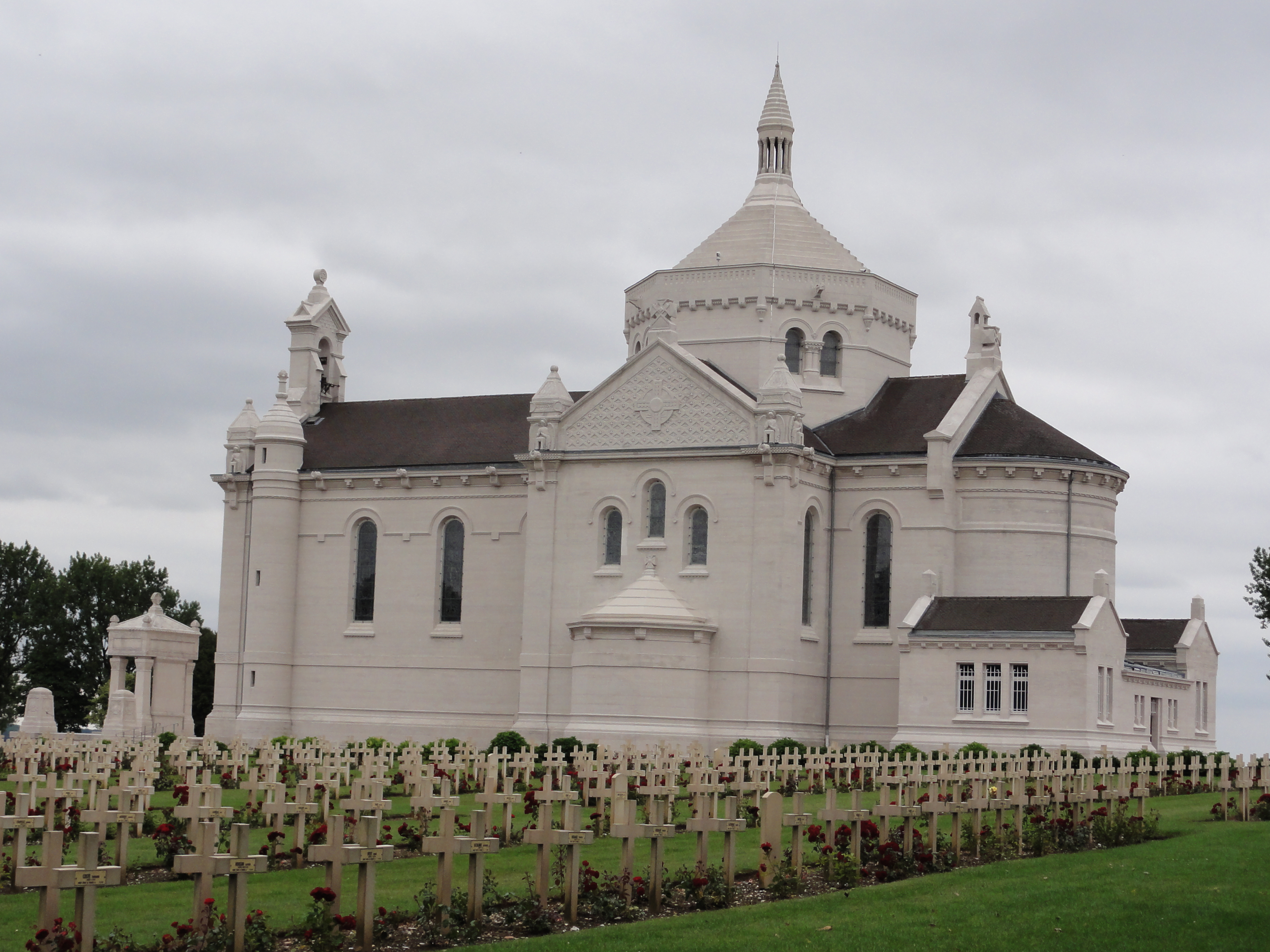
The Byzantine Basilica at Notre Dame de Lorette

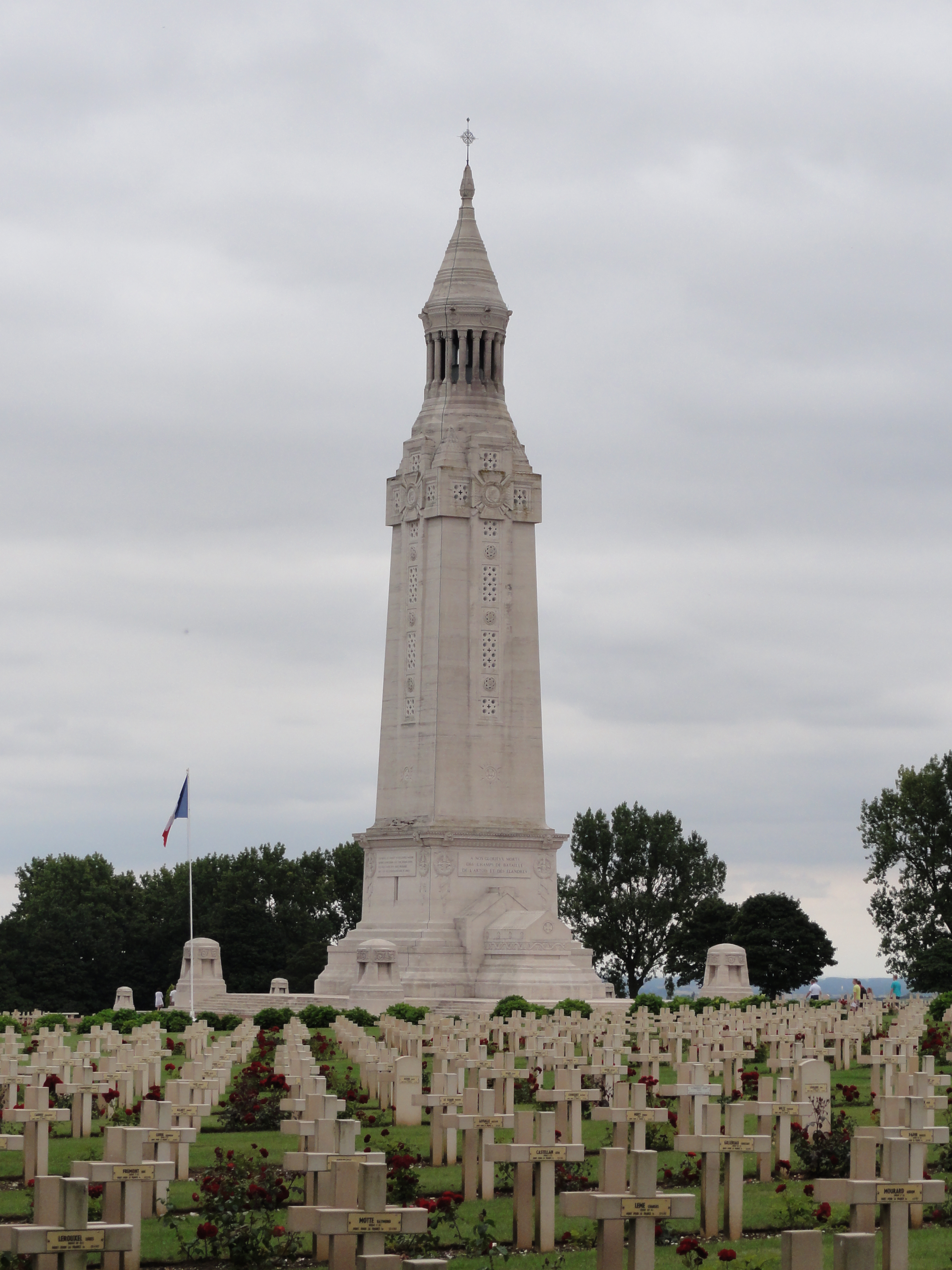
The Lantern Tower which sends a beam of light over the surrounding countryside.

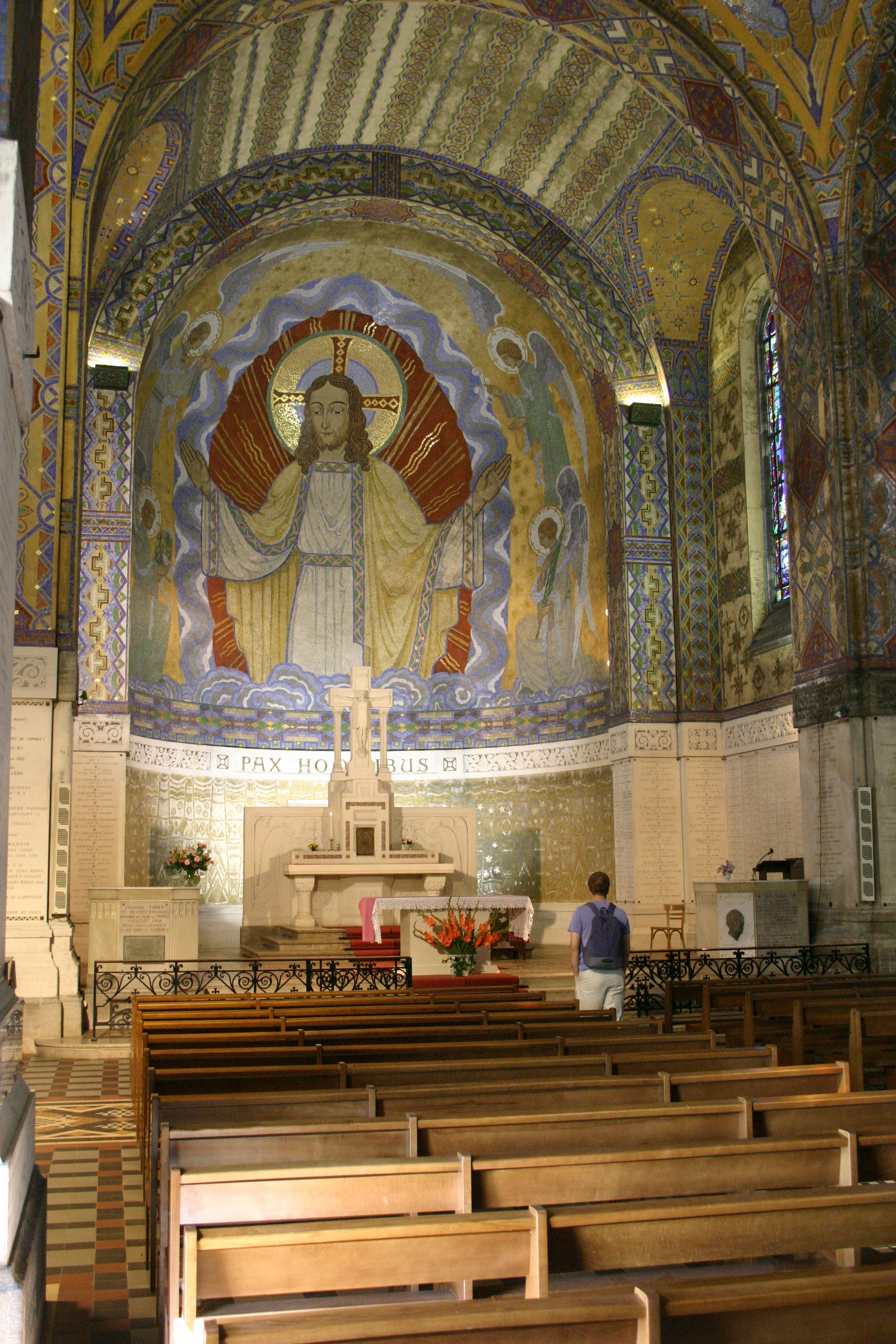
Interior view of the Basilica

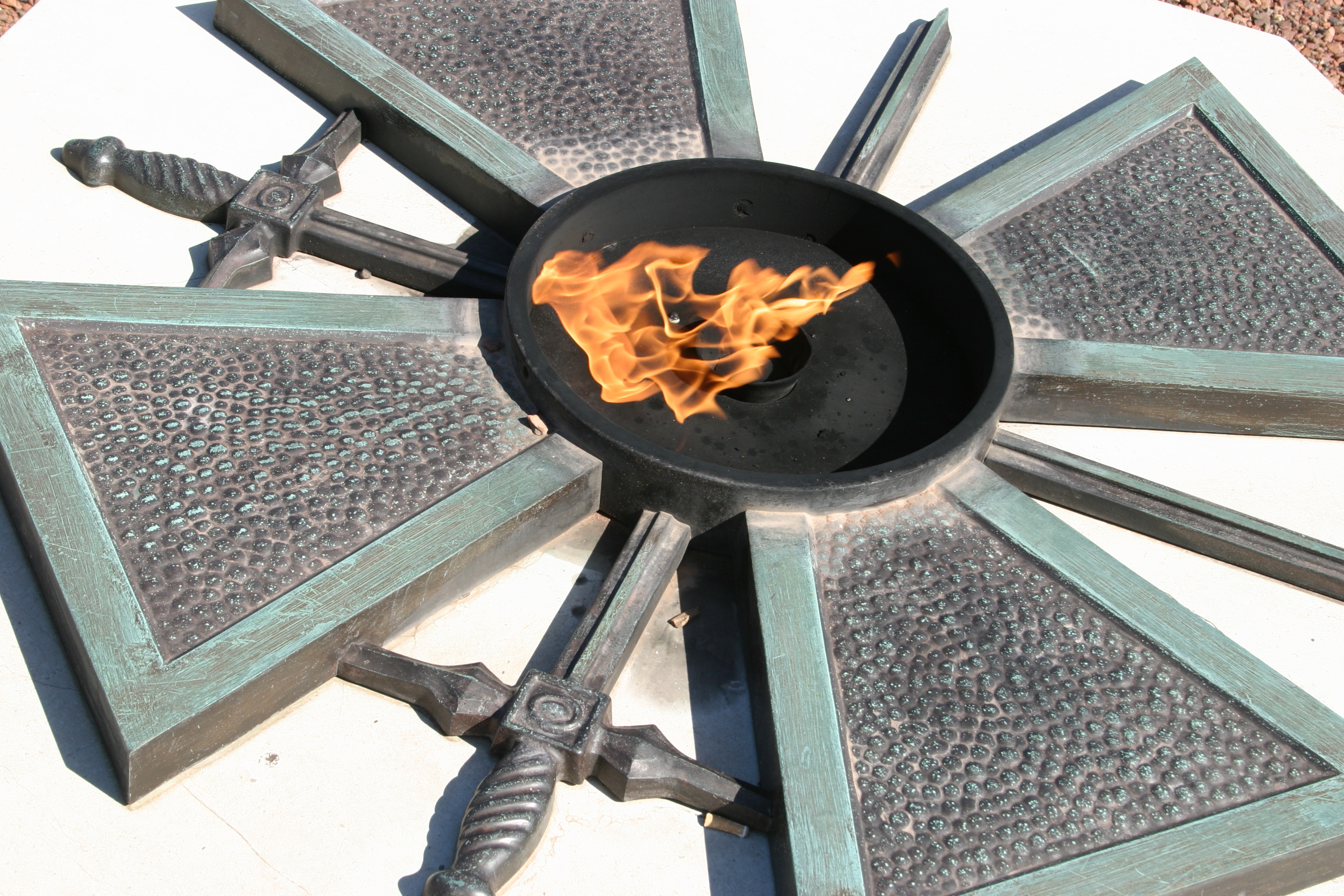
The eternel flame at Notre Dame de Lorette. Its maintenance is one of the duties of the "Voluntary Guard of Honour".

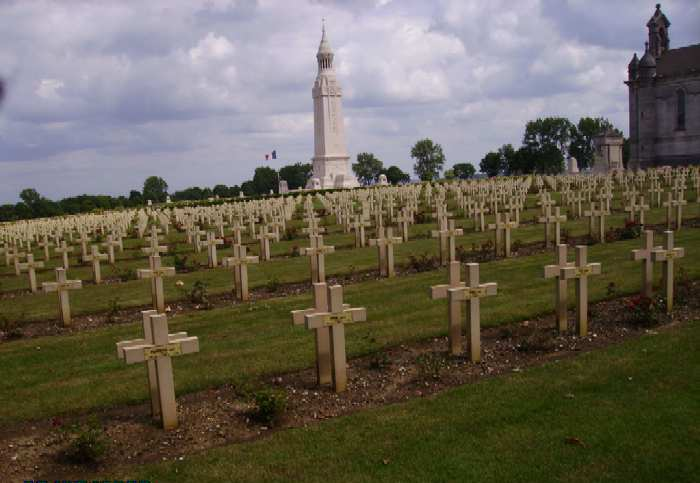
View of Lantern Tower and some of the many headstones at Notre Dame de Lorette

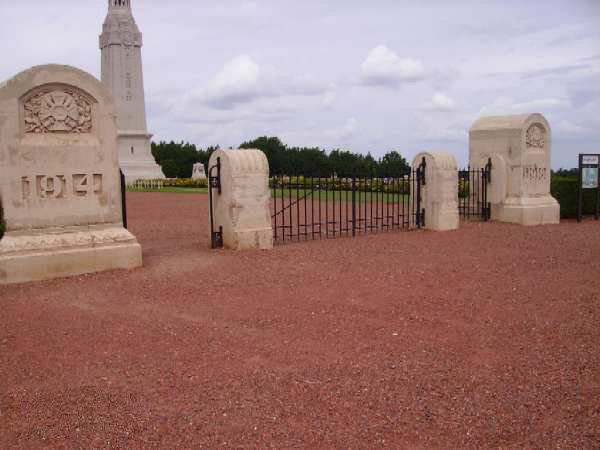
The entrance to Notre Dame de Lorette cemetery

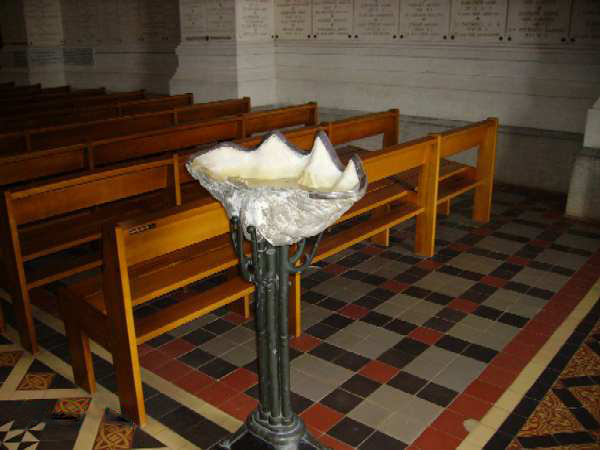
Stoup in the form of a shell in the Basilica at Notre Dame de Lorette

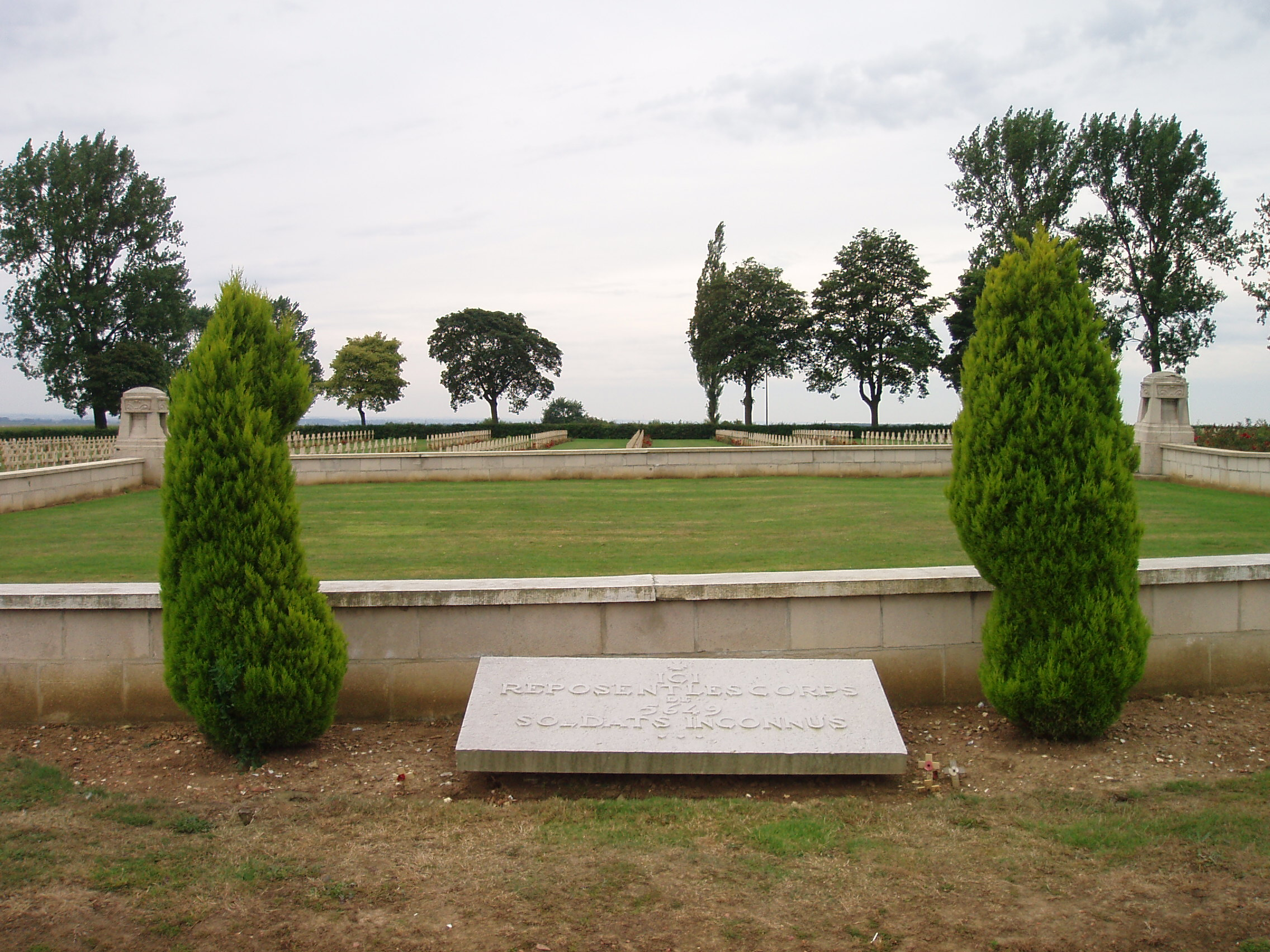
One of the ossuaries at Notre Dame de Lorette. This is the "Barbot" ossuary which contains 5,649 bodies.

=== Early fighting for Vimy Ridge ===
The ridge had fallen to the German Army in October 1914. The French Tenth Army attempted to dislodge the Germans from the region during the Second Battle of Artois in May 1915 by attacking their positions at Vimy Ridge and Notre Dame de Lorette. During the attack, the French 1st Moroccan Division briefly captured the height of the ridge, where the Vimy memorial is currently located, but was unable to hold it owing to a lack of reinforcements. (See photographs of the Moroccan memorial in the gallery below.) The French made another attempt during the Third Battle of Artois in September 1915, but were once again unsuccessful in capturing the top of the ridge.

In February 1916 the British XVII Corps relieved the French Tenth Army from the sector and, on 21 May 1916, the German infantry attacked the British lines along a 1,800-metre (2,000 yd) front in an effort to force them from positions along the base of the ridge. The Germans captured several British-controlled tunnels and mine craters before halting their advance and entrenching their positions. British counter-attacks on 22 May did not manage to change the situation, and in October 1916 the Canadian Corps relieved the British IV Corps and took up position along the western slopes of Vimy Ridge.

=== The Battle of Vimy Ridge 9 to 12 April 1917 ===
The Canadian Corps, commanded by Sir Julian Byng, was ordered to seize Vimy Ridge in April 1917.

In the week leading up to the battle, Canadian and British artillery subjected the enemy positions on the ridge to a constant barrage and the new No. 106 fuze, which allowed shells to explode on contact, as opposed to burying themselves in ground, facilitated the destruction of hardened defences and barbed wire.

The four Canadian divisions involved stormed the ridge at 5:30 a.m. on 9 April 1917. The Canadians showed great bravery and Hill 145, the highest and most important feature of the Ridge, and where the Vimy monument now stands, was captured in a frontal bayonet charge against machine-gun positions. After a further three days of fighting the Canadians were victorious. Victory was however achieved at a great cost with 3,598 Canadians killed and another 7,000 wounded.

The capture of Vimy was more than just an important battlefield victory. For the first time all four Canadian divisions attacked together: men from all regions of Canada were present at the battle. Brigadier-General A.E. Ross declared after the war, "in those few minutes I witnessed the birth of a nation."

In 1922, the French government ceded Vimy Ridge and its surrounding land to Canada in perpetuity. Unveiled in 1936, the Canadian National Vimy Memorial features white marble pylons and allegorical sculptures, serving as a monument to the 11,285 Canadian soldiers killed in France during World War I who have no known grave.

=== The Canadian National Vimy Memorial Site ===
The Canadian National Vimy Memorial site is located approximately 8 kilometres (5.0 mi) north of Arras, France, near the towns of Vimy and Neuville-Saint-Vaast. The site is one of the few places on the former Western Front where a visitor can see the trench lines of a First World War battlefield and the related terrain in a preserved natural state. The total area of the site is 100 hectares (250 acres), much of which is forested and off limits to visitors to ensure public safety. The site's rough terrain and unearthed unexploded munitions make the task of grass cutting too dangerous for human operators. Instead, sheep graze the open meadows of the site.

The site was founded principally as a location for the Vimy Memorial but it also contains a number of other memorials. These include memorials dedicated to the French Moroccan Division, the Lions Club International monument and that in honour of Lieutenant-Colonel Mike Watkins. There are also two Commonwealth War Graves Commission maintained cemeteries on site; Canadian Cemetery No. 2 and Givenchy Road Canadian Cemetery. Beyond being a popular location for battlefield tours, the site is also an important location in the burgeoning field of First World War battlefield archaeology, because of its preserved and largely undisturbed state. The site's interpretive centre helps visitors fully understand the Vimy Memorial, the preserved battlefield park, and the history of the Battle of Vimy within the context of Canada's participation in the First World War. The Canadian National Vimy Memorial and Beaumont-Hamel Newfoundland Memorial sites comprise close to 80 per cent of conserved First World War battlefields in existence and between them receive over one million visitors each year.

=== Images Vimy Memorial ===
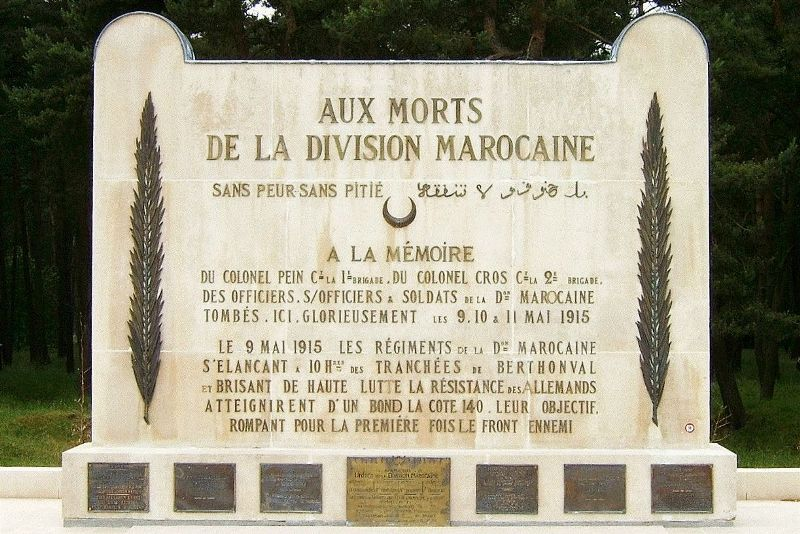
The Moroccan Division Memorial celebrates the efforts of the Moroccan Division on 9 May 1915.

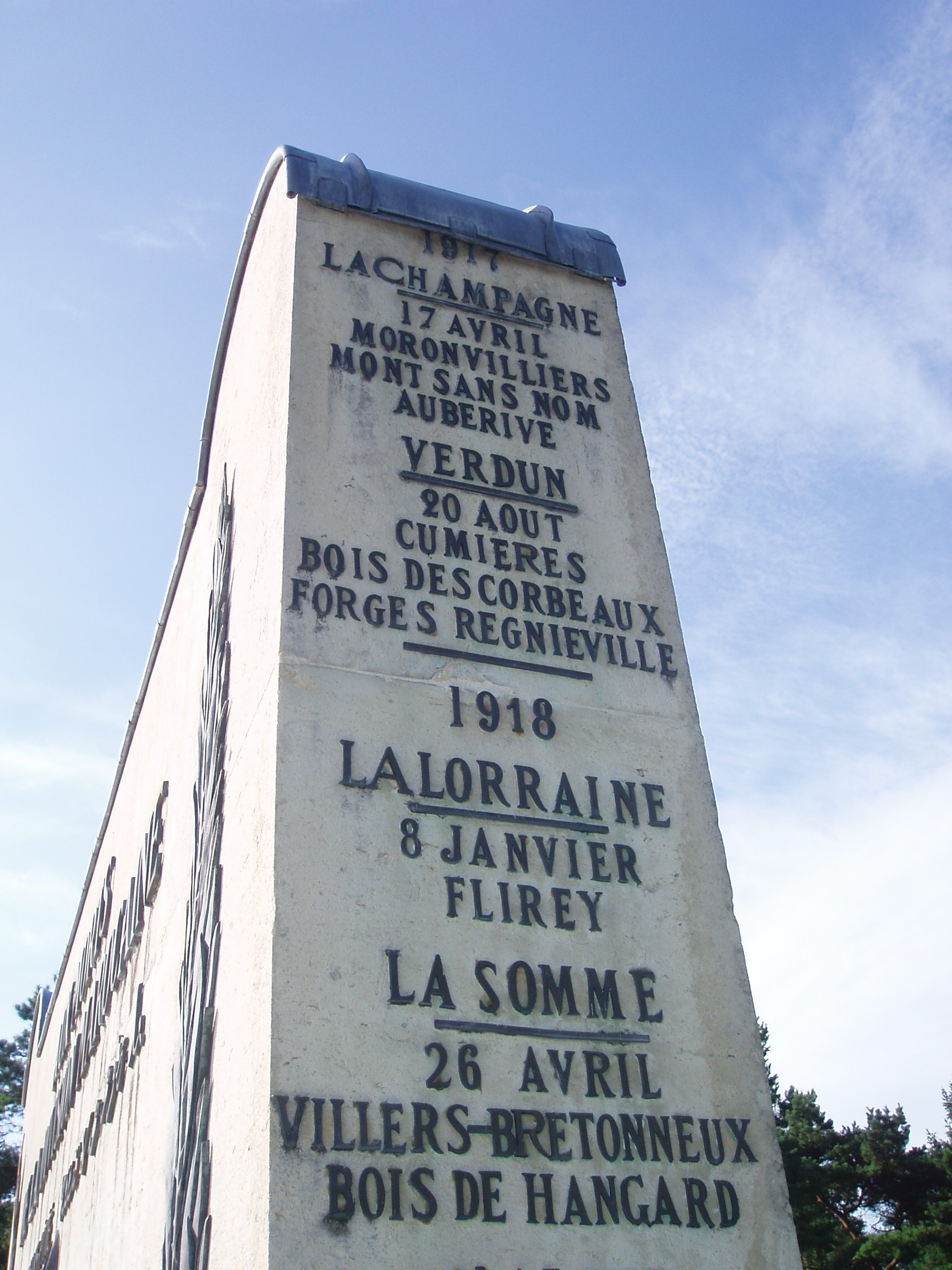
A side view of the Moroccan Division Memorial. The Moroccan Division's Battle Honours are listed.

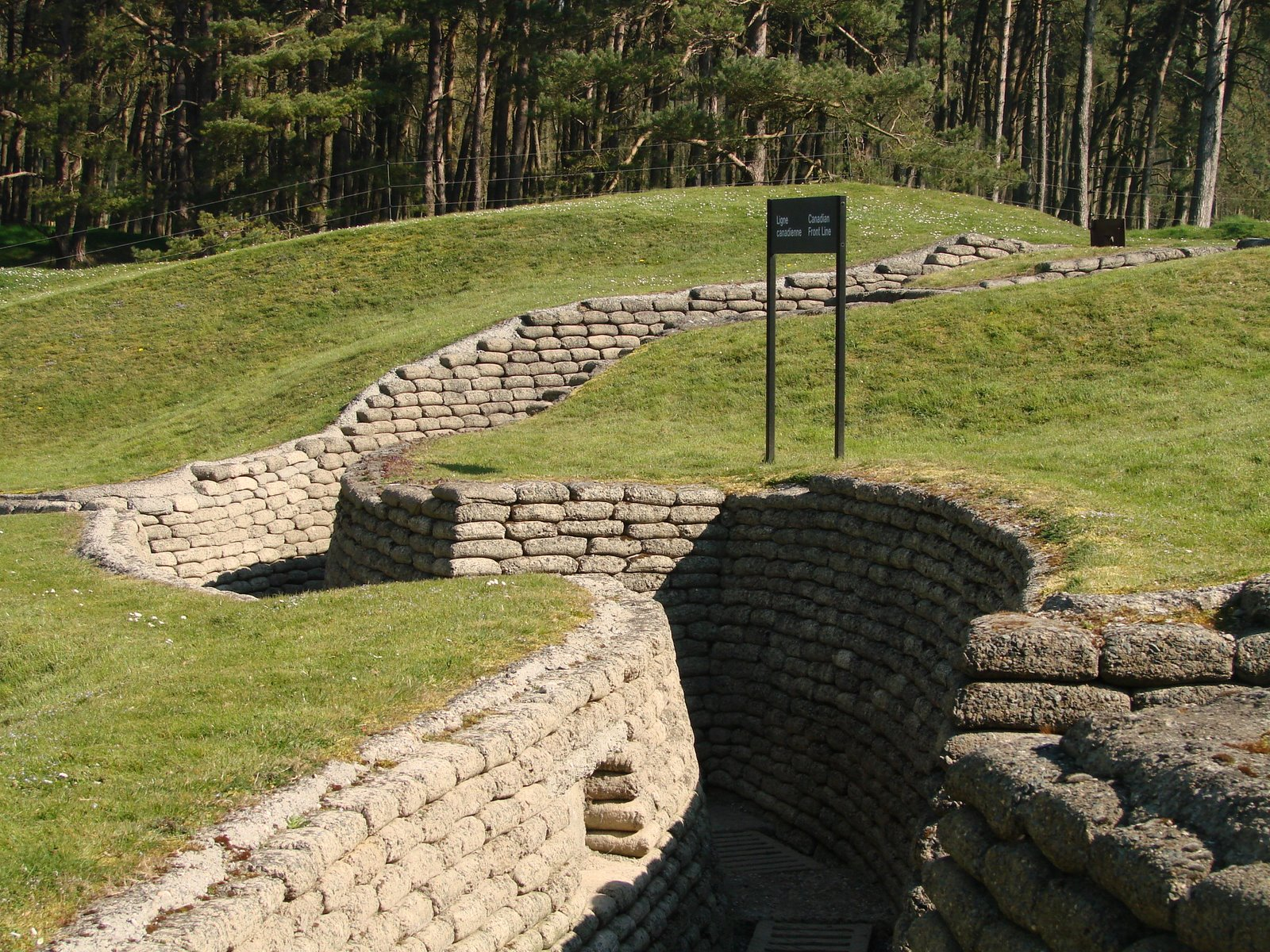
Preserved trenches at Vimy

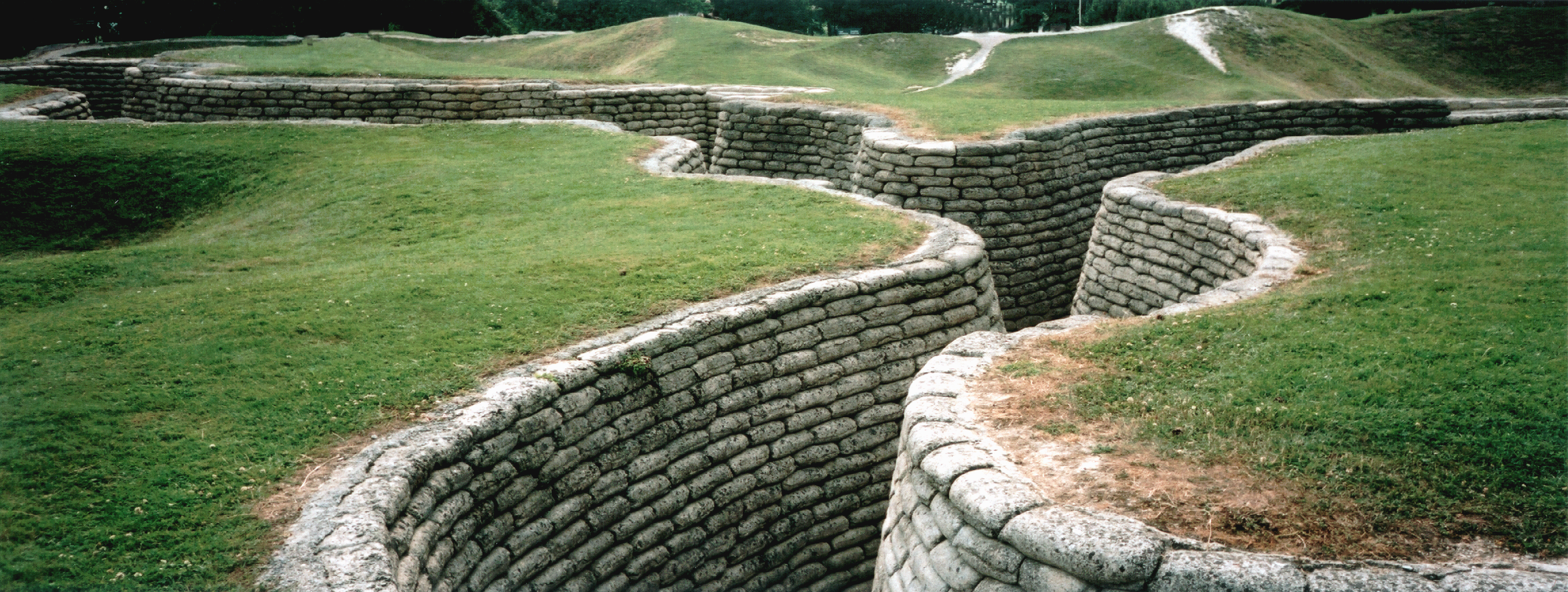
Further preserved trenches at Vimy

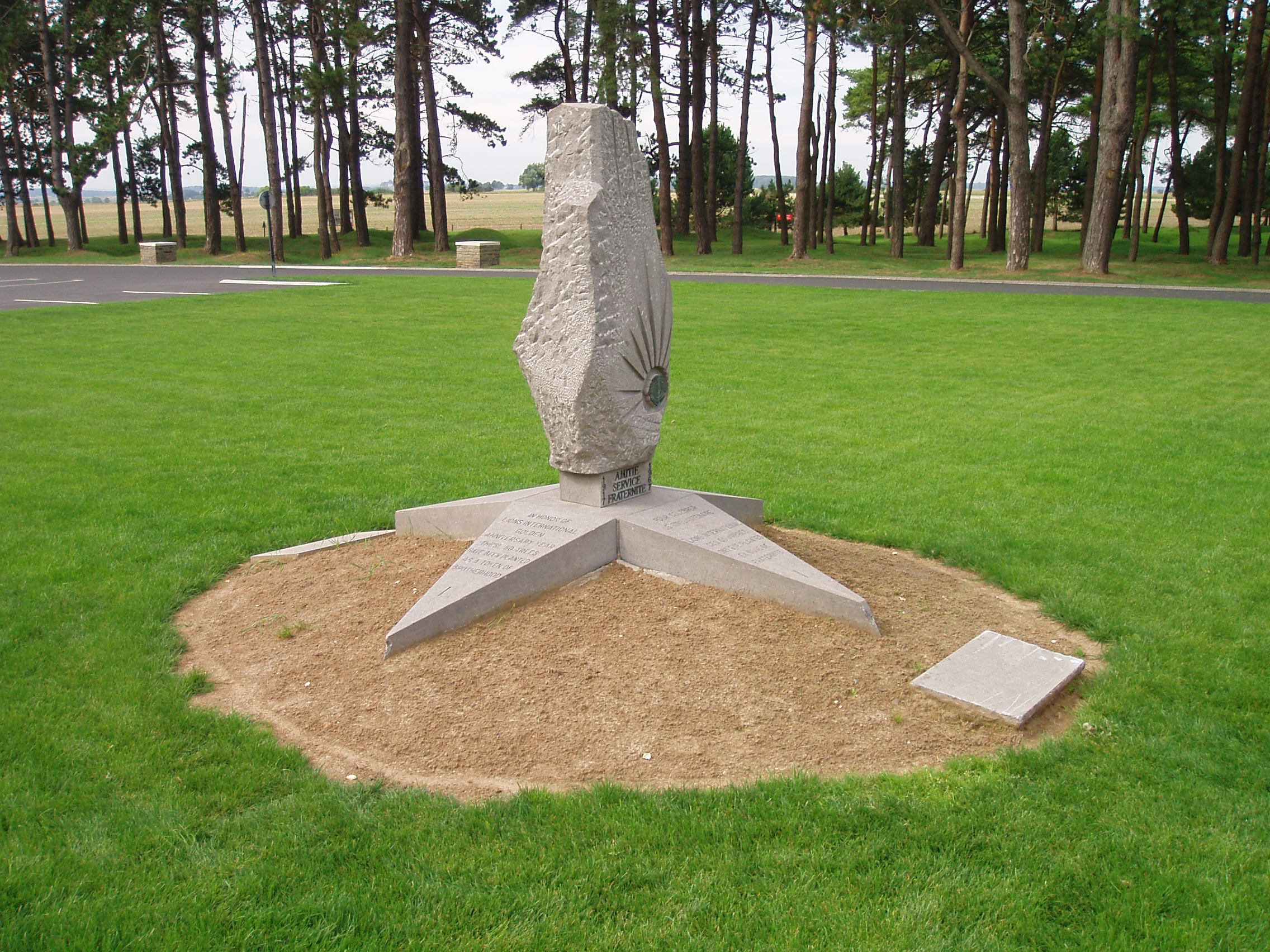
The Lions International Memorial at Vimy

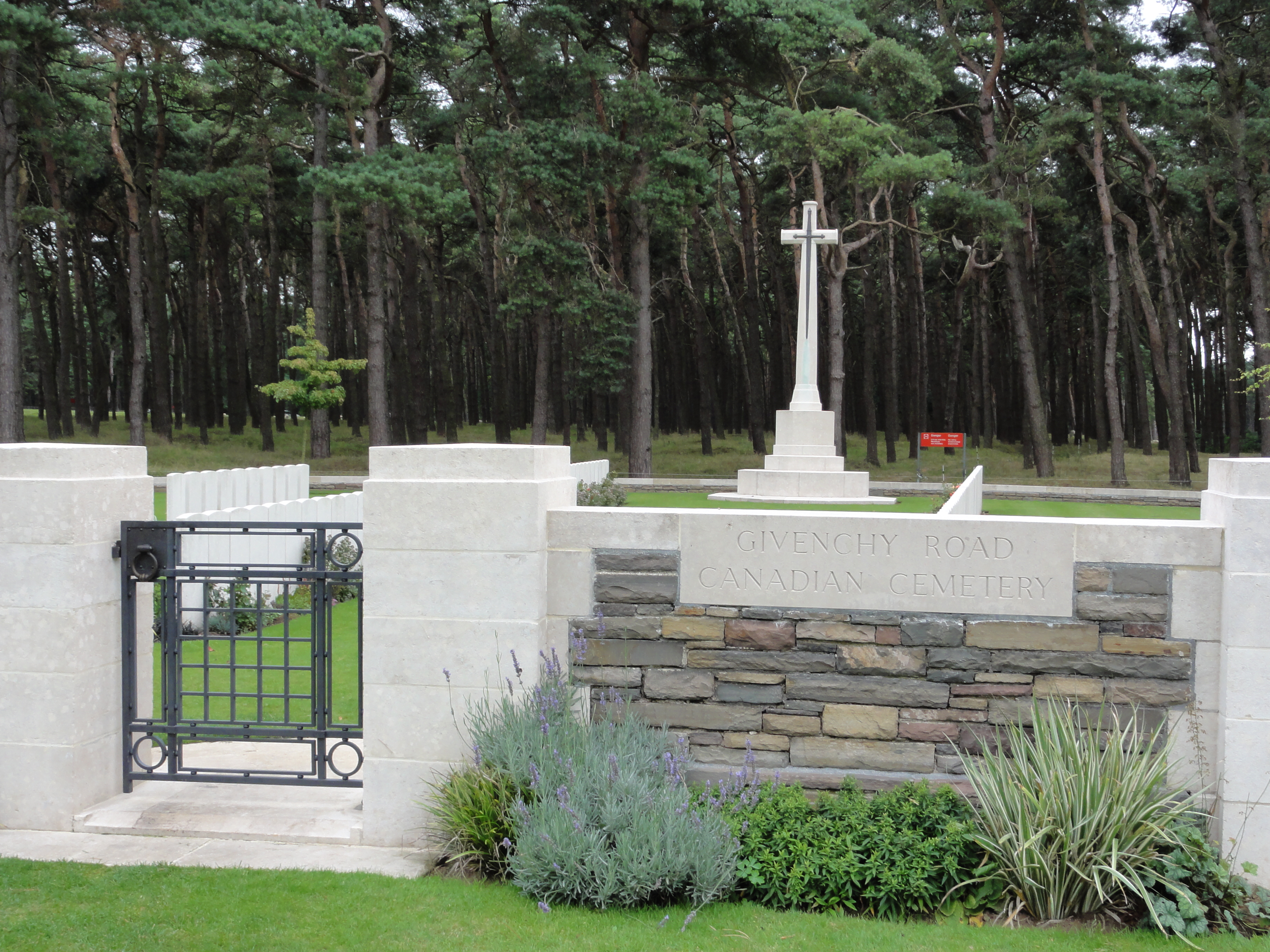
Givenchy Road Canadian Cemetery is one of two Canadian cemeteries at Vimy.

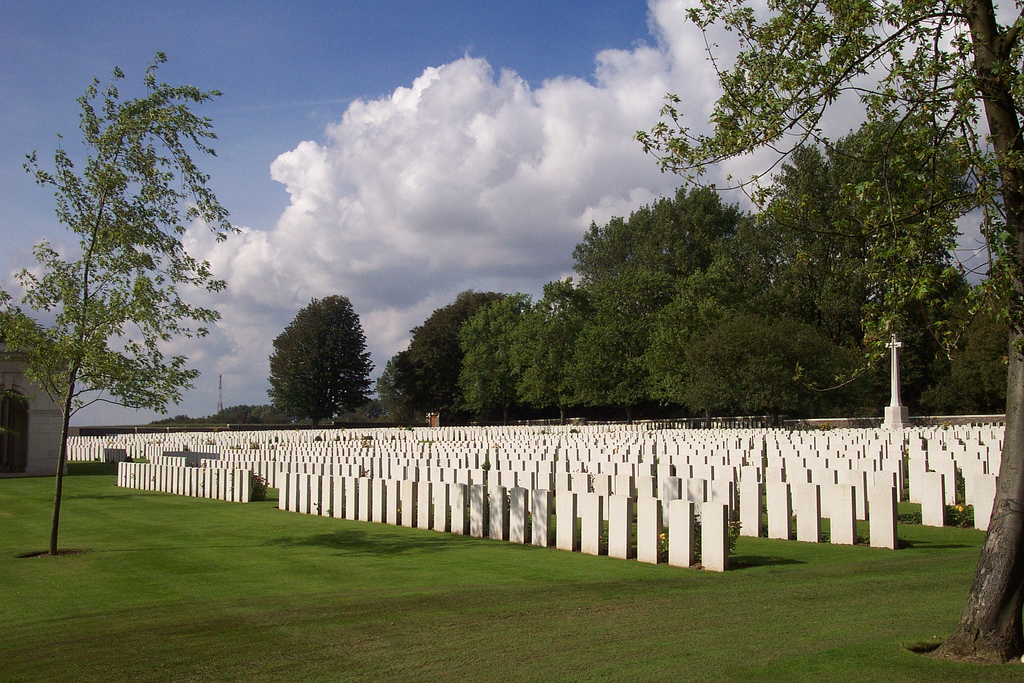
Canadian Cemetery No. 2 is the second of the two Canadian cemeteries at Vimy.

=== The Vimy Memorial ===
The Vimy memorial itself is the centrepiece of the 100-hectare (250-acre) preserved battlefield park. The memorial took Walter Seymour Allward eleven years to build. King Edward VIII unveiled the memorial on 26 July 1936, in the presence of the French President Albert Lebrun, together with 50,000 or more Canadian and French veterans, and their families. Following an extensive multi-year restoration, Queen Elizabeth II rededicated the memorial on 9 April 2007 during a ceremony commemorating the 90th anniversary of the battle.

Allward chose the highest point on the Vimy Ridge, Hill 145, as the most suitable location for the memorial. The front wall of the monument is 7.3 metres (24 ft) high and is meant to represent an "impenetrable wall of defence". There is a group of figures at each end of this wall next to the base of the steps. One group is entitled "Breaking of the Sword" and is located at the southern corner of this wall and at the northern corner is the composition entitled "Sympathy of the Canadians for the Helpless". Collectively these two groups are the "Defenders" and represent the ideals for which Canadians gave their lives during the war. There is a cannon barrel draped in laurel and olive branches carved into the wall above each group, this to symbolize peace. "Breaking of the Sword" depicts three young men, one of whom is crouching and in the act of breaking his sword, this representing the defeat of militarism and the general desire for peace. The original idea was for one figure to be shown crushing a German helmet with his foot but Allward later decided not to use this because of its overtly militaristic imagery. In "Sympathy of the Canadians for the Helpless", one man representing Canada stands erect while three other figures, stricken by hunger or disease, crouch and kneel around him. The standing man represents Canada's sympathy for the weak and oppressed; the helpless.

At the top of this front wall stands the figure of a cloaked young female, her head bowed and her eyes cast down. Her chin rests in one hand. Below her and at ground level is a sarcophagus which bears a Brodie helmet, a sword and is draped in laurel branches. This figure is known as "Canada Bereft" or "Mother Canada". The young nation of Canada mourns her dead. The statue was carved by the Italian sculptor Luigi Rigamonti. The statue, a reference to traditional images of the Mater Dolorosa and presented in a similar style to that of Michelangelo's Pietà, faces eastward looking out to the dawn of the new day. Unlike the other statues on the monument, stonemasons carved "Canada Bereft" from a single 30 tonne block of stone. The statue is the largest single piece in the monument and serves as a focal point. The twin pylons rise to a height 30 metres above the memorial's stone platform. The twin white pylons, one bearing the maple leaf for Canada and the other the fleur-de-lys for France, symbolize the unity and sacrifice of both countries. At the top of the two pylons is a grouping of figures known collectively as the "Chorus". The most senior figures represent "Justice" and "Peace". "Peace" stands with a torch upraised, making it the highest point in the region. These two works are in a style similar to Allward's previously commissioned statues of "Truth" and "Justice", located outside the Supreme Court of Canada in Ottawa. The figures of "Hope", "Charity", "Honour" and "Faith" are located below "Justice" and "Peace" on the eastern side, with "Truth" and "Knowledge" on the western side. Around these figures are the shields of Canada, Britain and France. Large crosses adorn the outside of each pylon. The First World War battle honours of the Canadian regiments and a dedicatory inscription to Canada's war dead, in both French and English, also appear on the monument. At the base of the monument and between the two pylons is the "Spirit of Sacrifice" Here a young dying soldier is gazing upward in a crucifixion-like pose, having thrown his torch to a comrade who holds it aloft behind him. In a lightly veiled reference to the poem "In Flanders Fields" by John McCrae, the torch is passed from one comrade to another in an effort to keep alive the memory of the war dead.

The "Mourning Parents", one male and one female figure, are reclining on either side of the western steps on the reverse side of the monument. They represent the mourning mothers and fathers of the nation and are thought to be based on the four statues by Michelangelo on the Medici Tomb in Florence, Italy. Inscribed on the outside wall of the monument are the names of the 11,285 Canadians killed in France, and whose final resting place is unknown. Most Commonwealth War Graves Commission memorials present names in a descending list format. Allward sought to present the names as a seamless list and decided to do so by inscribing the names in continuous bands, across both vertical and horizontal seams, around the base of the monument. The memorial contains the names of four posthumous Victoria Cross recipients; Robert Grierson Combe, Frederick Hobson, William Johnstone Milne and Robert Spall.

=== Images of the Vimy Memorial ===
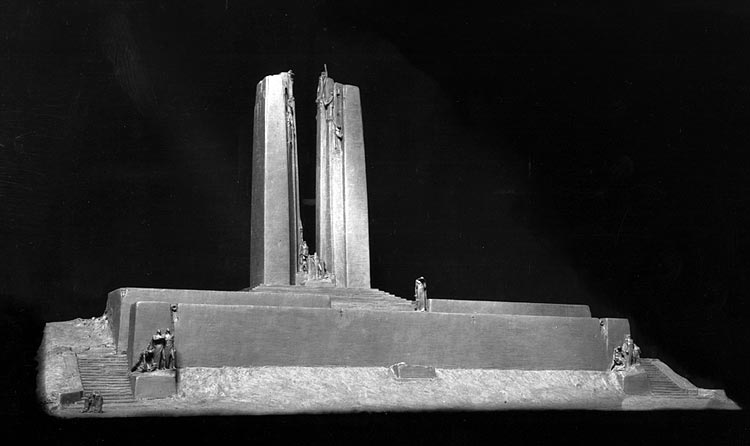
The winning submission to the Canadian Battlefields Memorials Commission competition was Walter Seymour Allward's winning maquette.

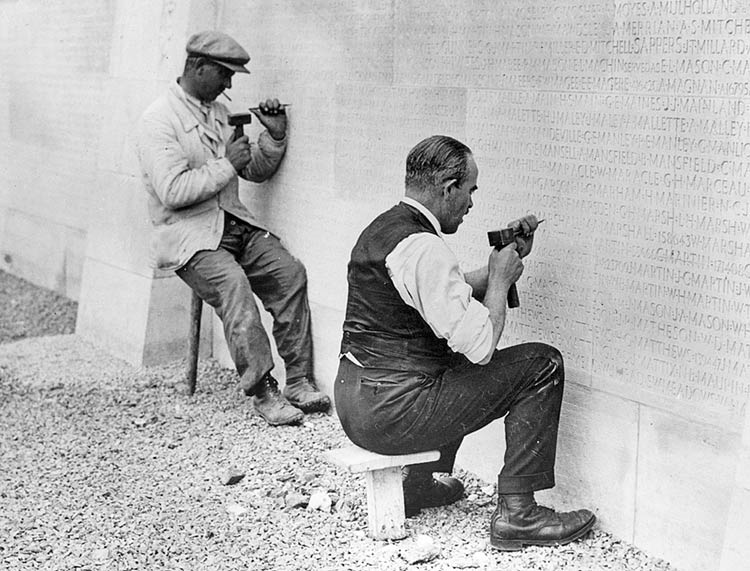
Masons shown carving the names on the Vimy Memorial

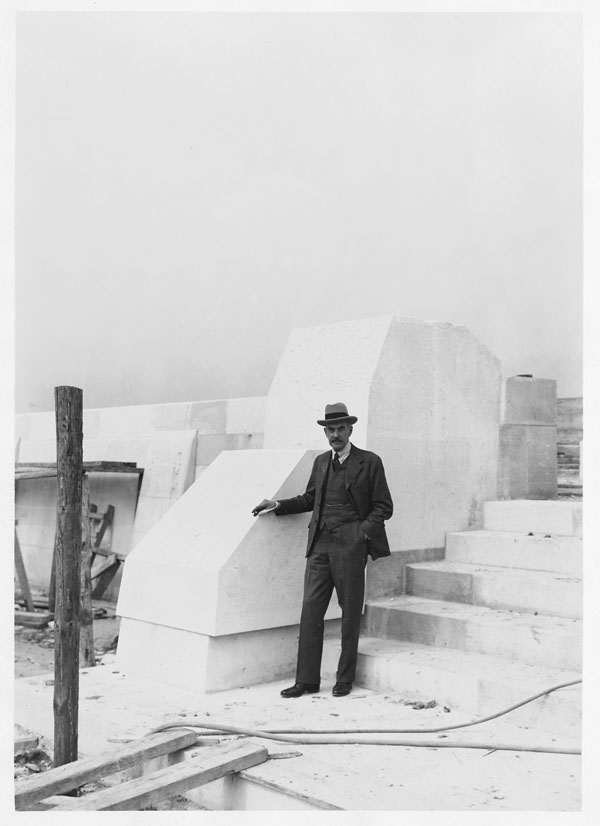
Walter Seymour Allward himself shown with blocks ready for carving

=== Caberet Rouge British Cemetery ===
The cemetery, near Souchez, is one of the largest British cemeteries on the Western Front and was begun as a cemetery in 1916. After the armistice it received bodies from small cemeteries and individual graves on the battlefields of Arras and other points in the Artois area. It holds: 6,800 British, 750 Canadian, more than 100 Australian, over 40 South African and 15 Indian graves. The majority are unidentified. The cemetery and the massive domed shelter at the entrance were designed by Frank Higginson. Higginson was a former Canadian Army officer who worked as an architect for the Commonwealth War Graves Commission in the 1920s and later acted as secretary to the commission; a bronze plaque in his memory is placed on the wall of the shelter building. German forces had seized the village of Souchez and the surrounding countryside as they advanced through Northern France in 1914. German artillery units were able to control this sector of the front from the high ground which flanked the village – Vimy Ridge to the east, and Lorette to the west. After 12 months of bitter fighting, French forces captured the high ground at Lorette in the autumn of 1915 but when they handed this part of the line to the Commonwealth forces in March 1916, Vimy Ridge was still in German hands. Vimy Ridge was certainly the key to the German defensive system in this sector and it protected an area of occupied France in which coal mines and factories were in full production for the German war effort; the fortified vantage points on the ridge dominated the surrounding battlefields. The Battle of Vimy Ridge formed part of the opening phase of the British-led Battle of Arras which began on 9 April 1917. The Canadian forces managed to capture most of the German positions on the ridge on the first day of the attack, and by 12 April they had occupied the village of Thélus and pushed the Germans back to the Oppy-Méricourt line. By taking the ridge the Canadians achieved a major tactical success, but in just four days of fighting they suffered over 10,000 casualties, 3,500 of whom were killed. The battle was the first action in which all four divisions of the Canadian Corps fought together.

On 25 May 2000 the remains of an unknown Canadian soldier were exhumed and handed to representatives of Canada at a ceremony held at the Vimy Memorial. These remains were laid to rest within the Tomb of the Unknown Soldier in a sarcophagus placed at the foot of the National War Memorial in Ottawa. A focal point for remembrance, he represents more than 116,000 Canadians who lost their lives during the First World War. A headstone in plot 8, Row E, Grave 7 marks his original grave.

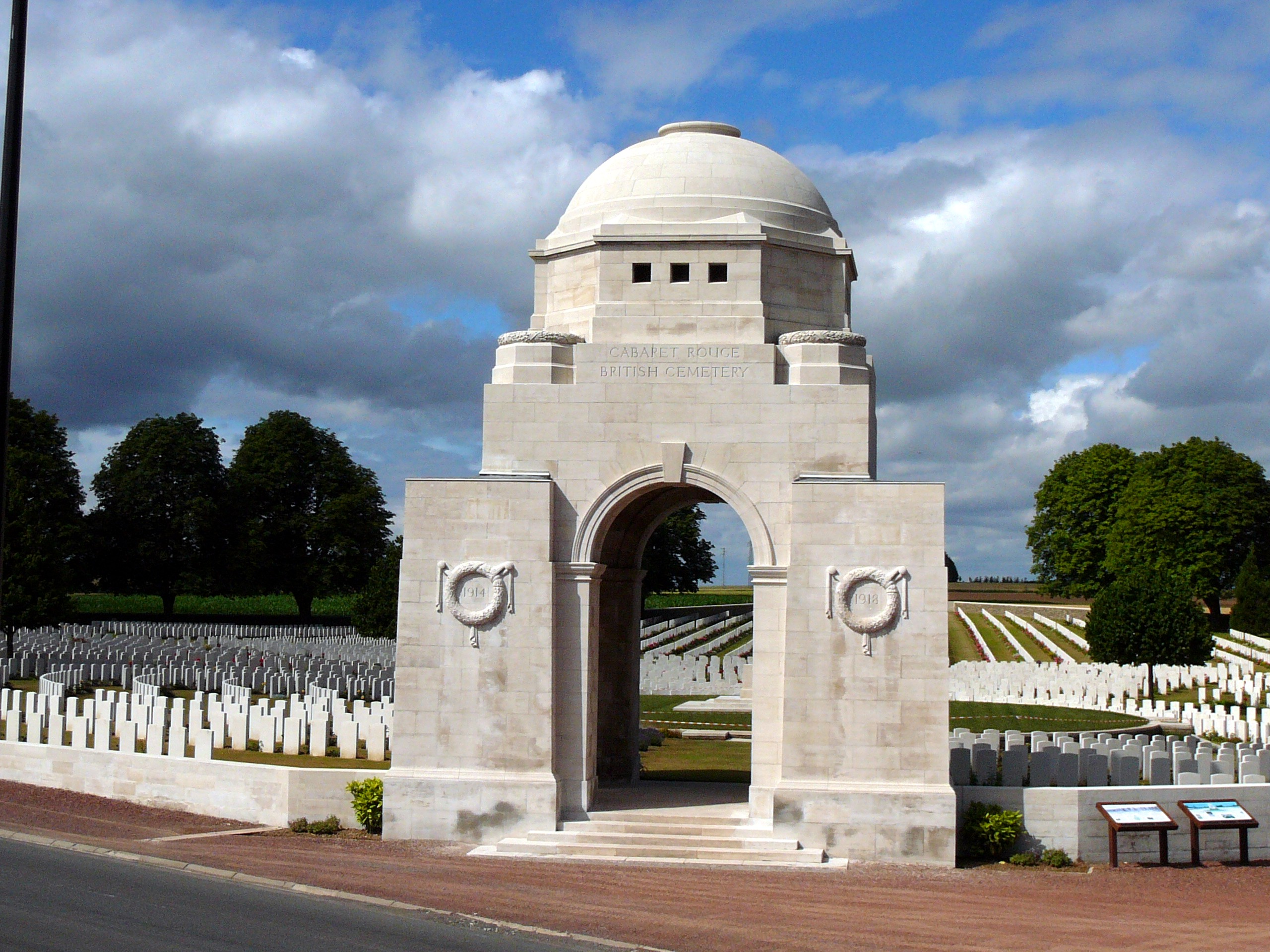
The domed entrance to Cabaret Rouge Cemetery

=== "Flambeau de la paix" ===
In Artois the scale of death is illustrated around the hamlet of La Targette in the parish of Neuville-Saint-Vaast. La Targette is the name of the road junction where the Béthune-Arras road crosses that running from Thèlus to Mont St Eloi. In one area La Targette British Cemetery, an enormous French National Cemetery, and a German cemetery with almost 45,000 dead buried in it. In La Targette village is the "Torch" memorial shown here. A hand bearing a torch emerges from a heap of rubble, representing the hand of a dead soldier; there is an identification tag on the wrist of the hand which carries the date 5 May 1915, and in front is a plaque, which invites the passerby to ponder on the many dead who died in this corner of France.

"Ô vivants qui passez près de ce flambeau, qui dresse son symbole aux champs des hécatombes, Attardez vos regards sur ce sol plein de tombes et soyez à nos morts dont le cœur était beau"

("O living people who pass by this torch, which draws his symbol in the fields of hecatombs, rest your eyes on this ground full of graves of our dead whose hearts were beautiful.")

The monument was erected in 1932 in memory of the men who fought in the area from May to June 1915. Rubble from houses in the village which had been destroyed during the war was used for the base of the monument.

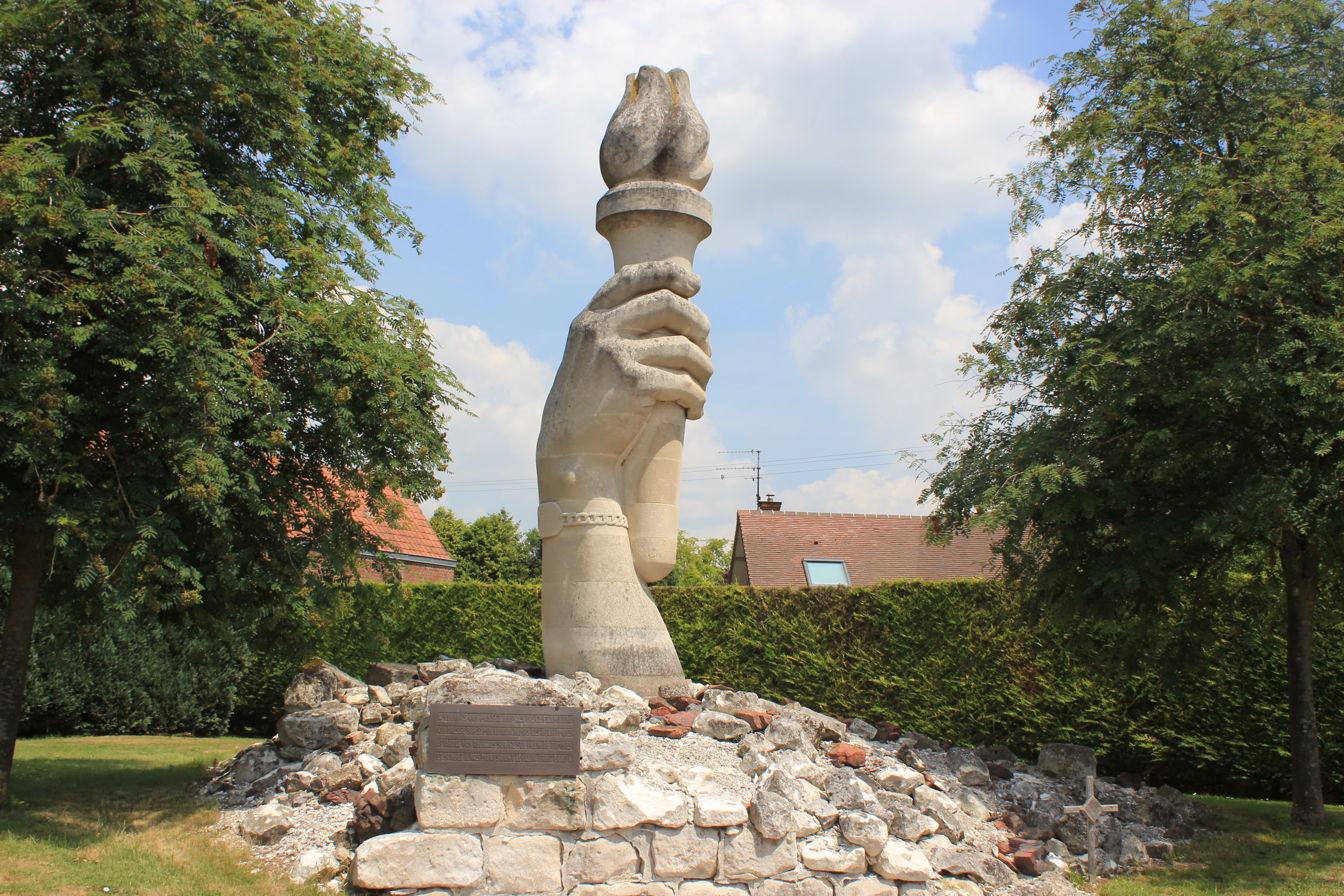
Flambeau de la paix ("Torch of peace")

=== La Targette French Military Cemetery ===
There is a large French war cemetery at La Targette. Many of the dead buried here would have taken part in the French Army's offensive of 9 May 1915 when the French used Neuville St Vaast as an important stepping stone in the operation to take Vimy Ridge. The Germans had heavily fortified the village with four lines of defence and each of its 150 houses bristled with cannon and machine guns. The labyrinth of trenches at the entrance to the village, flanked with forts and blockhouses, was thought to be impregnable; however slowly but surely French troops gained the position on 17 June 1915 at a cost of thousands of soldiers, many of whom were laid to rest in La Targette Cemetery. The French Army had recovered a Neuville-Saint-Vaast in ruins and taken Lorette Spur but Vimy Ridge still remained in German hands. In March 1916 the British Army relieved the French 10th Army at Arras and Canadian forces took charge at Vimy. Thenceforth began the preparation for an attack on Vimy Ridge which saw the excavation of a vast network of twelve tunnels up to the German lines. On 9 April 1917, in heavy snow, four Canadian divisions launched what was to be a successful attack on Vimy Ridge. The place known as Aux-Rietz was the forward command post for the 2nd Canadian Division and the artillery units who were given the job of providing cover for the soldiers on the ridge.

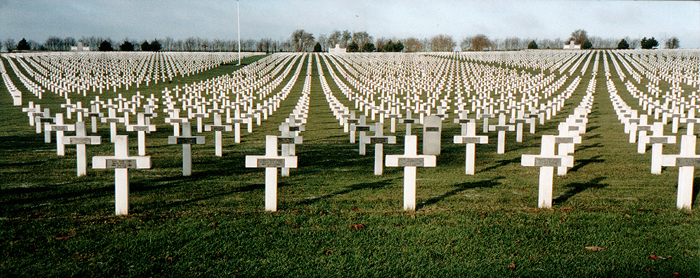
Part of the huge French Cemetery at La Targette

=== The German Cemetery at Neuville Saint Vaast known as "La Maison Blanche" ===
The Maison Blanche or Neuville-Saint-Vaast German War Cemetery was established at the end of the First World War and is the largest German war cemetery in France. It is the final resting place for 44,833 German soldiers of which 8,040 were never identified and were buried in a common grave. The bodies of the dead were originally buried in small cemeteries close to the Western Front, spread over more than 110 villages in Pas-de-Calais. Most of the soldiers had died in the intense fighting in Artois, on the Lorette Spur (1914–1915) and Vimy Ridge. In 1926, the French Government allowed the German War Graves Commission, the Volksbund Deutsche Kriegsgräberfürsorge (VDK), to carry out work on the cemetery but under its supervision. The VDK transformed what had until then been just a field into a proper war cemetery. Since 1966 the maintenance of the German War Cemeteries has been the responsibility of the VDK alone. Between 1975 and 1983 the VDK completely redesigned the cemetery and cast-iron crosses replaced the wooden ones, each one engraved with the names of four soldiers, and stone headstones were introduced for Jewish soldiers buried there. There is a monument in "La Maison Blance" with the inscription "ICH HATT EINEN KAMERADEN.EINEN BESSERN FINDST DU NICHT"- "I had a comrade; you could not find a better one". This monument is dedicated to the men of the 164th Infantry Regiment. The words are from the poem by Ludwig Uhland "Der Gute Kamerad."

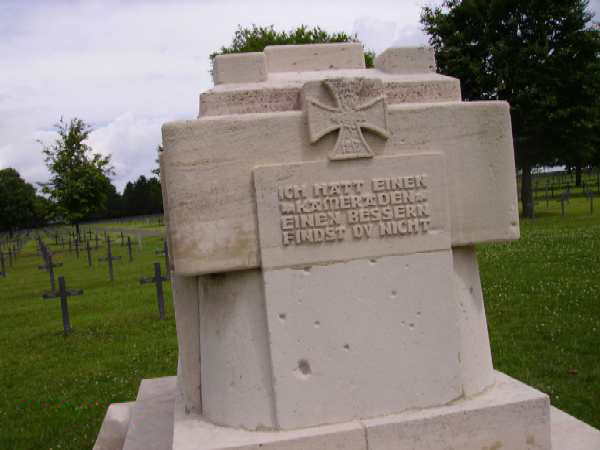
German memorial in "La Maison Blanche"

=== La Targette British Cemetery ===
La Targette British Cemetery lies to the south-west of the village of La Targette on the north-west side of the road to the village of Maroeuil. The cemetery was known formerly as the Aux-Rietz Military Cemetery. It was begun at the end of April 1917 and used by field ambulances and fighting units until September 1918. Nearly a third of the graves have an artillery connection given that in March–April 1917, the artillery of the 2nd Canadian and 5th Divisions, and certain heavy artillery units, had their headquarters in a deep cave at Aux-Rietz.

=== Czechoslovak Cemetery and Memorial – Neuville-Saint-Vaast ===
The Czechoslovak Memorial and Cemetery are located just outside Neuville-Saint-Vaast and within the small cemetery lay the remains of 206 Czechoslovaks; 70 from the First World War and 136 from the Second (Including 29 airman). Czechs and Slovaks were minorities within the Austro-Hungarian Empire and, at the declaration of war in 1914, hundreds living in France took the decision to fight for France within the ranks of the Foreign Legion. At the beginning of May each year there is a short ceremony at the cemetery which was enlarged in 1970 by the consolidation of all Czech and Slovak nationals buried in France. They formed the Nazdar Company (coming from their battle cry meaning: "Hello"). On 9 May 1915, the company would lose 50 men killed and 150 wounded out of a strength of 250. (A photograph of the Czech memorial is shown here.) These volunteers took part in the Artois offensive launched by the French on 9 May 1915 and many lost their lives in that battle. At the entrance to the Czech cemetery stands a monument to commemorate the standard-bearer Karel Bezdicek who was killed on the first day of fighting. He is remembered by his fellows as the first free Czech soldier to carry the standard of the Czech lion.

On the other side of the road, the cross of the Polish volunteers (paid for by donations from the Polish communities of Pas-de-Calais) pays tribute to those who 'gave their lives for the resurrection of Poland and the victory of France'. Despite being destroyed in 1940 and storm-damaged in 1967, the monument has been rebuilt and bears the motto "Za wolność naszą i waszą" which means "For our freedom and yours".

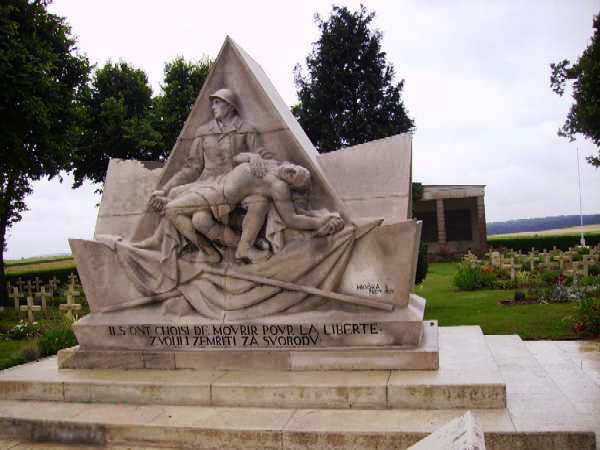
The Czech Memorial

== Sector 4. Artois: Arras and Cambrai ==
=== St Laurent-Blangy German Cemetery ===
Next to Bailleul Road East Cemetery is the Saint-Laurent-Blangy Cemetery which was begun in the early 1920s by the French as a concentration cemetery for the German soldiers who fell in the fighting south of Arras. It also contains a mass grave for unidentified soldiers. It was in 1926 that the Volksbund Deutsche Kriegsgräberfürsorge (VDK, German war graves commission) received permission from the French authorities to plant trees on the site and in later years the VDK, were able to carry out further improvements including the replacements of the wooden crosses by metal ones. The cemetery is the last resting place for 31,939 German soldiers who died in the Great War, including 7,069 individual graves and a mass grave containing 24,870 bodies of which 11,587 were never identified. The names of the soldiers who do not have individual graves are engraved on black metal panels which are displayed on either side of a small path alongside the ossuary. The graves of Jewish soldiers are marked with headstones bearing the Star of David and an inscription in Hebrew which reads, 'Here lies [name of the soldier], may his soul be bound to the circle of the living'. In 1956, building works forced the closure of the German extension to Comines Cemetery, near Lille, and the remains of 4,283 German soldiers were moved to Saint-Laurent. However the memorial erected in their honour still stands in Comines Cemetery.

=== The Arras Memorial and the Flying Services Memorial and the Battle of Arras ===
The Battle of Arras was a British offensive during the First World War. From 9 April to 16 May 1917, British, Canadian, New Zealand, Dominion of Newfoundland, and Australian troops attacked German defences near the city of Arras.

At this phase of the war, the Allied objective was to end the stalemate of the trenches and break through the German defences into the open ground beyond and engage the numerically inferior German army in a war of movement. The French High Command's plan was to launch a massive attack (the Nivelle Offensive) about 80 kilometres (50 mi) to the south of the British sector in the Aisne region and at Arras the Allied objectives were to draw German troops away from the ground chosen for the French attack and to take the German-held high ground that dominated the plain of Douai. The British effort was a relatively broad front assault between Vimy in the northwest and Bullecourt in the southeast. After considerable bombardment, Canadian troops advancing in the north were able to capture the strategically significant Vimy Ridge and British divisions in the centre were also able to make significant gains astride the Scarpe river. In the south, British and Australian forces were frustrated by the elastic defence and made only minimal gains. When the battle officially ended on 16 May, British Empire troops had made significant advances but had been unable to achieve a breakthrough and the stalemate of the trenches returned.

The Battle of Arras is normally divided into two phases. Phase one would embrace three encounters: the First Battle of the Scarpe which ran from 9 to 14 April 1917; the First Battle of Vimy Ridge from 9 to 12 April 1917; and the First Battle of Bullecourt from 10 to 11 April 1917.

The Second phase would embrace the Battle of Lagnicourt on 15 April 1917; the Second Battle of the Scarpe from 23 to 24 April 1917; the Battle of Arleux from 28 to 29 April 1917; the Second Battle of Bullecourt from 3 to 19 May 1917; and the Third Battle of the Scarpe from 3 to 4 May 1917.

A great deal of ground was gained for relatively few casualties in the first two days and a number of strategically significant points were captured, notably Vimy Ridge. Additionally, the offensive succeeded in drawing German troops away from the French offensive in the Aisne sector. In many respects, the battle might be deemed a victory for the British and their allies but these gains were offset by high casualties and the ultimate failure of the French offensive at the Aisne.

Siegfried Sassoon makes reference to the battle in his famous anti-war poem "The General" in which he derides the incompetence of the British military staff. The Anglo-Welsh lyric poet, Edward Thomas was killed by a shell on 9 April 1917, during the first day of the Easter Offensive. Thomas's war diary gives a vivid and poignant picture of life on the Western front in the months leading up to the battle.

Sassoon's poem read-

'Good-morning; good-morning!' the General said
When we met him last week on our way to the line.
Now the soldiers he smiled at are most of 'em dead,
And we're cursing his staff for incompetent swine.
'He's a cheery old card,' grunted Harry to Jack
As they slogged up to Arras with rifle and pack.
* * *
But he did for them both by his plan of attack.

=== The Arras Memorial ===
The Arras Memorial is to be found in the western part of Arras, and commemorates almost 35,000 servicemen from the United Kingdom, South Africa, and New Zealand who died in the Arras sector between the spring of 1916 and August 1918, the eve of the "advance to victory", who have no known grave. Alongside the Arras Memorial is The Arras Flying Services Memorial. This commemorates nearly 1,000 airmen of the Royal Naval Air Service, the Royal Flying Corps, and the Royal Air Force, either by attachment from other arms of the forces of the Commonwealth, or by original enlistment, who were killed on the whole of the Western Front and who have no known grave.

Two files held at The National Archives in Kew, ADM 116/2906 and AIR 2/9244 provide background information on the unveiling ceremony and ADM 116/2906 contains an "Introduction to the register of THE ARRAS MEMORIAL at Faubourg-D'Amiens Cemetery, Arras, France" Memorial register 20. This was published by the Commonwealth Graves Commission and contains much valuable information. File ADM116/2906 indicates that Captain R. Bell Davies, V.C., D.S.O., A.F.C., R.N, represented the Admiralty at the Arras unveiling ceremony on 31 July 1932.

File AIR 2/9244 provides background information on the Arras unveiling from the Air Ministry perspective also the Thiepval Memorial. The file contains a selection of press cuttings covering the Arrras and Thiepval unveilings. The file notes that The Lord Trenchard, G.C.B., D.S.O., carried out the Arras unveiling and also laid the wreath at Thiepval on behalf the RAF. Sir William Reid Dick, the Scottish sculptor, was responsible for the globe on top of the Arras Flying Services Memorial. He carved both the badges on the memorial and the great globe, which is 4.5 feet (1.4 m) in diameter and weighs almost three tons. The memorial consists of an obelisk with a globe forming a finial on the top. The badges are those of the Royal Flying Corps, Royal Air Force, Royal Naval Air Service, and the combined badges of Canada, Australia, New Zealand and South Africa. File AIR 1/677/21/13/1891 provides further background information on the Arras Memorial. It contains a draft of the Introduction to the Register of the Imperial War Graves Commission (now the Commonwealth War Graves Commission) written by their Director of Records, Major H.F. Chettle. Chettle's covering letter is dated 18 March 1930. The two Memorials and the lay-out of the cemetery are the work of Sir Edwin Lutyens.

The Arras Flying Services Memorial includes amongst the men remembered a winner of the Victoria Cross, Edward "Mick" Mannock who died on 26 July 1918 aged 31.

Amongst those commemorated on the Arras Memorial are T/2nd Lieutenant Richard Basil Brandram Jones, Sergeant John Erskine, T/2nd Lieutenant John Harrison, Corporal George Jarratt, Sergeant Albert White and A/Company Sergeant-Major Alexander Edwards, all winners of the Victoria Cross.

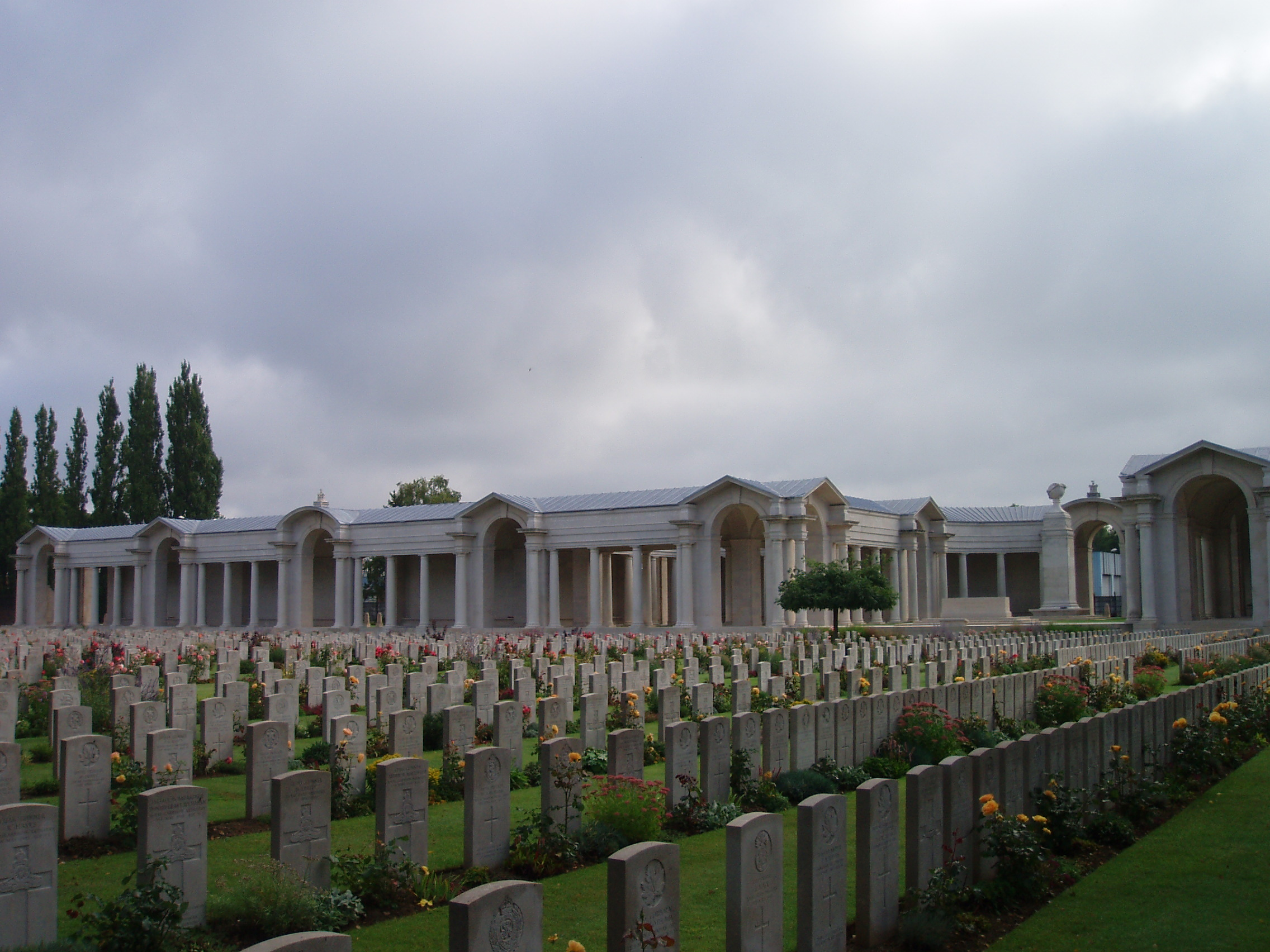
The Arras Memorial and the Fauberg-D'Amiens Cemetery

=== Memorial to the New Zealand Tunnelers at Arras ===
At Arras there is a memorial to New Zealand tunnelers who built a vast underground city used by thousands of British troops during WW1. The tunnel network under the city of Arras in northern France was built between 1916 and 1918 by members of the New Zealand Tunnelling Company, who were specially recruited from the gold and coal mining districts of New Zealand. The 400-strong Kiwi tunnellers, who had undertaken only basic military training, worked to combat the Germans, burrowing under no-man's land to blow up and destroy the enemy trenches above.

New Zealand's Ambassador to France, Sarah Dennis, who unveiled the memorial said

"This memorial is a welcome and fitting tribute to the courage and tenacity of the New Zealand Tunnelling Company. The scale and resilience of the network they constructed is remarkable: Arras deserves its prominent place in New Zealand's shared memories of World War One"

The memorial is dedicated to the memory of the 41 New Zealand tunnelers who lost their lives at Arras and the 151 who were wounded – many who were buried under tonnes of rubble from German counter-mining.

The Kiwi tunnelers joined a number of large chalk quarries built in medieval times to develop two tunnel systems running under the main roads of Arras. In one tunnel system each cave is named after a New Zealand town – Russell, Auckland, New Plymouth, Wellington, Nelson, Blenheim, Christchurch, Dunedin, and finally, just before the German front line, Bluff.

Working parties to assist the tunnellers were sent from the New Zealand Division and included Maori and Pacific Islanders of the New Zealand Pioneer Battalion. Through the winter of 1916, as the town of Arras above was destroyed by German artillery, the underground city grew large enough to accommodate 20,000 men. There was running water, electric lighting, kitchens, latrines, a light rail system and a medical centre with a fully equipped operating theatre. On 9 April 1917, 15,000 men moved through the tunnels to launch the Battle of Arras. The New Zealand tunnelers remained in France, repairing roads, developing other tunnel systems, and building and repairing bridges. They returned to New Zealand in March 1919.

=== Memorial to General Ernest Barbot at Souchez ===
Near to the Cabaret Rouge Cemetery and 12 kilometres (7.5 mi) from Arras is the village of Souchez and the memorial to Général Ernest Barbot.

Ernest Jacques Barbot was born on 19 August 1855 at Toulouse. He graduated as a Second Lieutenant on 1 October 1877 and slowly climbed the ranks. In September 1912 he became the Colonel of the 159e RIA (they were known as the 15-9, Quinze-Neuf). By the age of fifty-seven he had lost both his wife and son and would devote the rest of his life to his Grelus as people from the high Alps are called.

Once Italy had declared its neutrality, the 159e RIA was transferred from the Franco-Italian frontier to Alsace and their accomplishments soon brought Barbot to the attention of his senior officers. Having already effectively taken over command of his own brigade he was promoted to Général de Brigade on 8 September 1914. To this was added a second brigade, creating what was designated as the Division Barbot. In September 1914 his Division was transferred to the Artois Front and officially designated the "77e Division d'Infanterie". In the battle for Arras, Barbot's convictions and his soldiers' tenacity were fundamental in saving the town from occupation by the Germans.

As the German line continued to encircle Arras to the north, Barbot and his Division found themselves transferred to the area in front of Souchez – their Corps was now officially designated the 33e CA and was commanded by Général Philippe Pétain. As a Colonel Petain had commanded the Arras Regiment (33e RI) and one of his young lieutenants was Charles de Gaulle. On 9 May 1915 the 2nd Battle of Artois was launched by the French against the hills of Notre Dame de Lorette and Vimy.

On its right the Moroccan Division stormed across the plain and took Vimy Ridge, 4 kilometres (2.5 mi) away, in a single rush. In the centre, Barbot's men made superb gains getting as far as Hill 119, Givenchy and the outskirts of Souchez. Hill 119 became known as "The Pimple" to the Canadians in 1917 and is the steep hill immediately opposite the site of Barbot's monument. Unfortunately the speed of their advance proved to be the 77e DI's undoing and under violent bombardment they were forced to retire from Givenchy, back as far as the Cabaret Rouge on the hill above Souchez. (Near the site of the CWGC Cemetery).

Barbot installed his HQ in a rough trench at Cabaret Rouge despite the fact that the position was still under bombardment. On 10 May 1915 at about 11:00 a.m. while dashing across the open ground to talk to one of his colonels Barbot was hit by shrapnel. With a severe chest wound and a broken arm, he was carried back to Berthonval Wood (just in front of Mont St Eloi) and from there transported by car to the Dressing Station at Villers-Châtel. The surgeons found that they could do nothing for him. General d'Urbal dispatched a staff office to award Barbot the Cross of a Commander of the Legion of Honour and he died a short time later. His last words were recorded as

"Glorious Day. Victory!"

The Barbot Memorial was designed by Paul Dechin and sculpted by his father Jules Dechin. Work began in 1935 under a committee headed by General Pétain, and the monument was inaugurated on Sunday 9 May 1937 in the presence of numerous VIPs and thousands of veterans of the Alpine Division. The statue is not only dedicated to General Barbot himself, as commander of the 77e DI, but also to his men who fell in Artois between 1 October 1914 and 20 February 1916. Dechin depicts Barbot standing with a hand in between two buttons of his greatcoat (like Napoleon) and a gesture of his right hand suggests that he is trying to protect his soldiers who can be seen climbing up out of their trenches in berets – there were no steel helmets in 1915.

On either side of the monument are two commemorative plaques. One is to General Plessier who had preceded Barbot as commander of the 77e DI and was the first General killed in action (at Alsace on 19 August 1914), the other to General Stirn who took over on Barbot's death but was himself killed two days later.

A story recounted in the Regimental History and perhaps apocryphal is of an ordinary soldier encountering the elderly Barbot in the trenches. He asked Barbot why on earth he had not been demobilised considering his age and Barbot replied

"They won't let me. Why ever not ? Because I'm the General"

=== Memorial to the 9th Scottish Division at Point du Jour ===
Point du Jour lies to the north east of Arras and in fighting there on 9 April 1917, the 34th Division tried to take a German redoubt. The 30 feet (9.1 m) foott high memorial commemorates that division's fighting in the area including a successful advance along the north bank of the River Scarpe towards Fampoux. The memorial is built in the Highland manner from blocks of granite and has the inscription

"Remember with honour the 9th Scottish Division who on the fields of France and Flanders 1915–1918 served well"

In recent years access to this site has been difficult due to the fast Arras – Douai road close by, and in late 2006 the Commonwealth War Graves Commission moved the memorial to a new site alongside the Point du Jour Military Cemetery. Access to this memorial is now via Fampoux, from the direction of nearby Athies. Some of the memorial stones have been damaged, and it seems the section of preserved trench is lost.

=== Memorial to the 64th Infantry Brigade in Cojeul British Cemetery ===
File WO 32/5881 held at The National Archives in Kew covers the years 1919 to 1922 and provides some background information on the memorial to the 64th Infantry Brigade which now stands in Cojeul British Cemetery, St Martin-sur-Cojeul, near Arras. Originally a wooden cross had been raised to commemorate those men of the 64th Brigade who had fallen in 1917. This wooden cross was replaced by a stone cross in 1931, the wooden cross being removed for safe keeping to Beverley Minster in York. At a later date the stone cross was moved to the cemetery at Cojeul when a motorway was built in the area. The dedication reads

"To the honoured memory of the officers and men of the 64th Infantry Brigade who fell on 9 April 1917 in capturing the part of the Hindenburg line close to this place"

=== The 42nd Division Memorial at Trescault ===
The 42nd Division Memorial in Trescault has 1914–1918 inscribed on the front and is surmounted by a cross with diamonds carved in relief.

The inscription on the front reads

"In memory of all ranks of the 42nd East Lancashire Territorial Division who gave their lives for King and Country during the Great War and in commemoration of the attack and capture of the Hindenburg line at Trescault by the Division on 28 September 1918"

The inscription is also given in French on the rear of the memorial. The memorial was completed by 1921 and officially unveiled by Major-General Solly-Flood on Easter Sunday in 1922.

=== Memorial to the 62nd Division at Havrincourt ===
The memorial comprises a very tall obelisk, with tall iron railings around it, and the pelican motif of the Division carved on two of its corners. The Division's battle honours are recorded on the sides of the memorial, including Havrincourt from 1917. The 62nd Division attacked in a north-easterly direction through and either side of the village on 20 November 1917, with the Canal du Nord on the left as the Divisional boundary. The Hindenburg Line was very strong here but they had fifty tanks to support them (although there should have been more than sixty according to the plans). It took them 30 minutes to reach the Hindenburg Line, and take this (it curved south-east of the village), and by 8.15 a.m. they had reached the Blue Line – 2,000 yards (1,800 m) on from their start point, although resistance continued in Havrincourt village for some time. By 11 a.m. the Division were advancing on the next objective, the Brown Line, and by the end of the day 186 Brigade had reached Graincourt, an advance of around 7,000 yards (6,400 m) from the starting position. The village of Havrincourt was lost in March 1918 during the major German offensive. The 62nd Division again retook the village on 12 September 1918 and held it despite German counter-offensives. The 62nd Division has a strong association with the area, and this explains the decision to place their memorial here. Some of their men from both the above encounters lie in the cemetery nearby. File WO 32/5855 held at The National Archives at Kew covers the memorial to the 62nd Division at Havrincourt. The unveiling took place on 7 June 1922 and was carried out by General Berthelot under whose command the 62nd Division took part in the Second Battle of the Marne in July 1918. The file contains a list of all the men who took part in the unveiling.

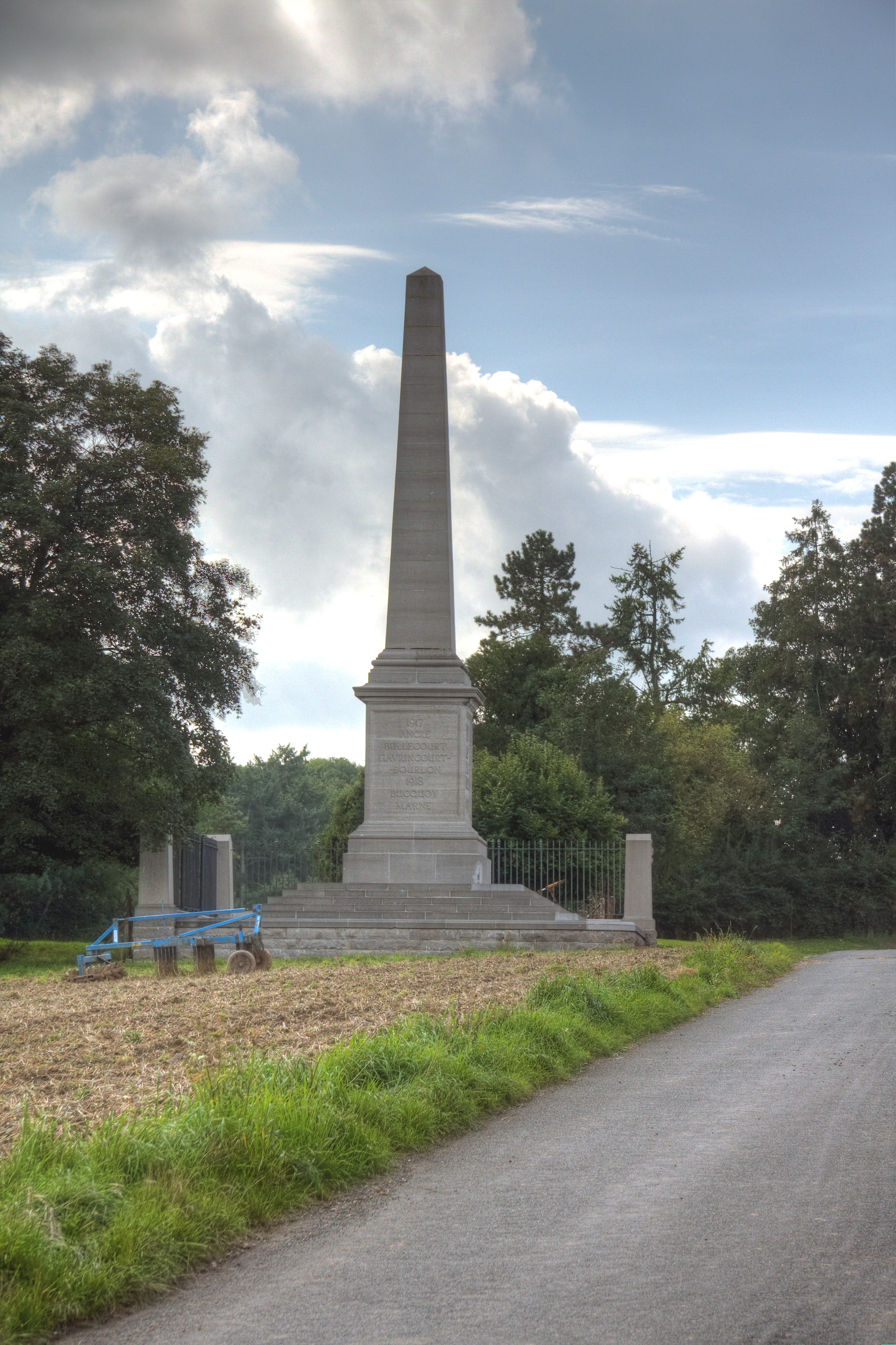
62nd Division Memorial

=== Cambrai Memorial and Louverval Military Cemetery ===
On 25 August 1914 the German Army entered Cambrai and remained there until 9 October 1918, when Canadian Forces liberated the town. The Battle of Cambrai was launched by the British Army on 20 November 1917, and was to grind to a halt 6 kilometres (3.7 mi) from Cambrai with massive losses suffered on both sides. The subsequent German counter-attack pushed the Allies back to their starting position. This battle is generally regarded as the first major battle of the First World War in which tanks were used. Until then the pattern was for battles to begin with a sustained artillery bombardment to hopefully break through the German barbed-wire defences with the infantry following under cover of smoke barrages. The Cambrai battle began on 20 November 1917 with great initial success, but a halt called for "rest and reorganisation" on 22 November 1917 allowed the Germans time to take stock and reinforce. From 23 to 28 November the fighting was concentrated almost entirely around Bourlon Wood and by 29 November 1917, the Germans had mounted a major counter-attack and during fierce fighting over the next five days, succeeded in gaining much of the ground they had lost when the attack was launched. The tank had been no more successful in breaking through the German barbed wire than had been the artillery bombardments on the Somme in 1916 and at other battles. The inscription on the Memorial reads

"To the glory of God and to the enduring memory of 7048 Officers and men of the Forces of the British Empire who fell at the Battle of Cambrai 20 November – 3 December 1917 but who have no known grave Their names are here recorded."

This engagement and many of the losses sustained is remembered by the Cambrai Memorial in the cemetery at Louverval. This memorial commemorates the 7,048 officers and men of the British and South African Armies who were to perish in the course of the Battle of Cambrai in 1917 but who have no known grave. The memorial was designed by H. Charlton Bradshaw and has two bas-reliefs by Charles Sargeant Jagger one depicting a wounded man being lifted from a trench and in the other a soldier is shown looking through a periscope.

=== The German War Cemetery on the Solesmes road and the Cambrai East Military Cemetery ===
|Many of the dead from the Cambrai battle are buried in the Solesmes road cemetery which embraces both a German War Cemetery and a cemetery containing British and Commonwealth casualties as well as those from France. The German War Cemetery holds the graves of 7,939 German soldiers who lie in graves marked by white crosses, the original black crosses having been replaced in 1977. The remains of an additional 2,746 men are buried in the cemetery ossuary. Part of the cemetery is the Cambrai East Military Cemetery, which contains the graves of 501 Commonwealth soldiers and another corner is devoted to the dead of the French Army, mostly Russians. This cemetery had been started by the Germans during their occupation, and had been handed over to the city of Cambrai by the Bavarian Commandant for their care and maintenance. In the cemetery's centre is a large cross with a surrounding wall surmounted with a German and French military helmet. This was one of the many monuments erected by the Germans.

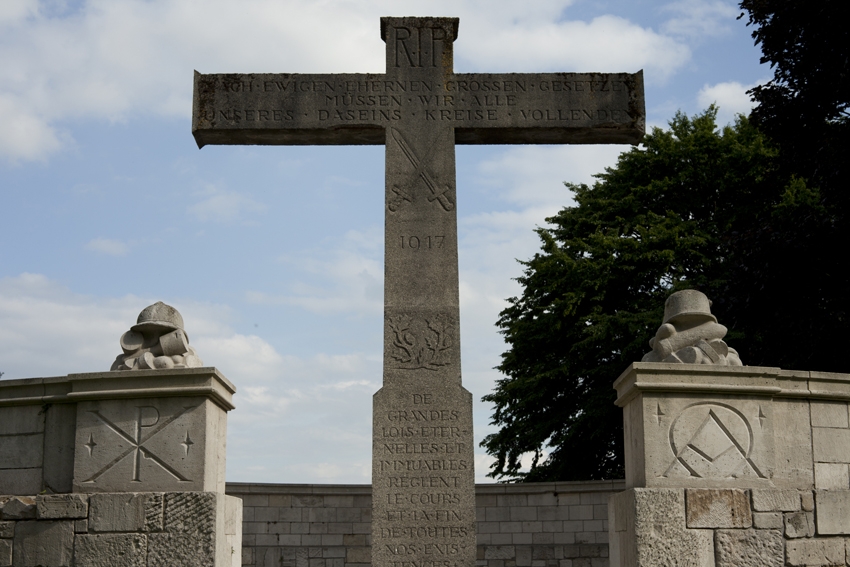
The cross in the Solesmes road cemetery surmounted by German and French helmets

=== Caribou Memorial at Monchy Le Preux ===
A commemoration made by the men from Newfoundland is to be found in the village of Monchy Le Preux. On the ruins of what was a German bunker stands a bronze caribou which faces a point known at the time of the Great War as "Infantry Hill". This is the Newfoundland Regiment Memorial, or "Caribou" memorial. Here on 14 April 1917, companies A, C and D of the 1st Battalion Newfoundland Regiment, along with the 1st Essex both of the 88th Brigade/29th Division, were assigned the capture of Infantry Hill. At 5:30 a.m. both battalions advanced behind a creeping artillery barrage. The Newfoundlanders reached the foot of the hill despite heavy German machine gun and artillery fire. As they reached the top of the hill they were met by three German battalions, one in front and one each to the left and right. The Newfoundlanders were virtually surrounded and by 9:00 a.m. the situation was hopeless. The surviving groups of men were forced to surrender. The Newfoundlanders' losses were second only to their casualties suffered on 1 July 1916 at Beaumont-Hamel on the Somme. On 14 April 1917, 166 Newfoundlanders lost their lives, a further 141 men were wounded and 153 captured. The Caribou Memorial commemorates that action.

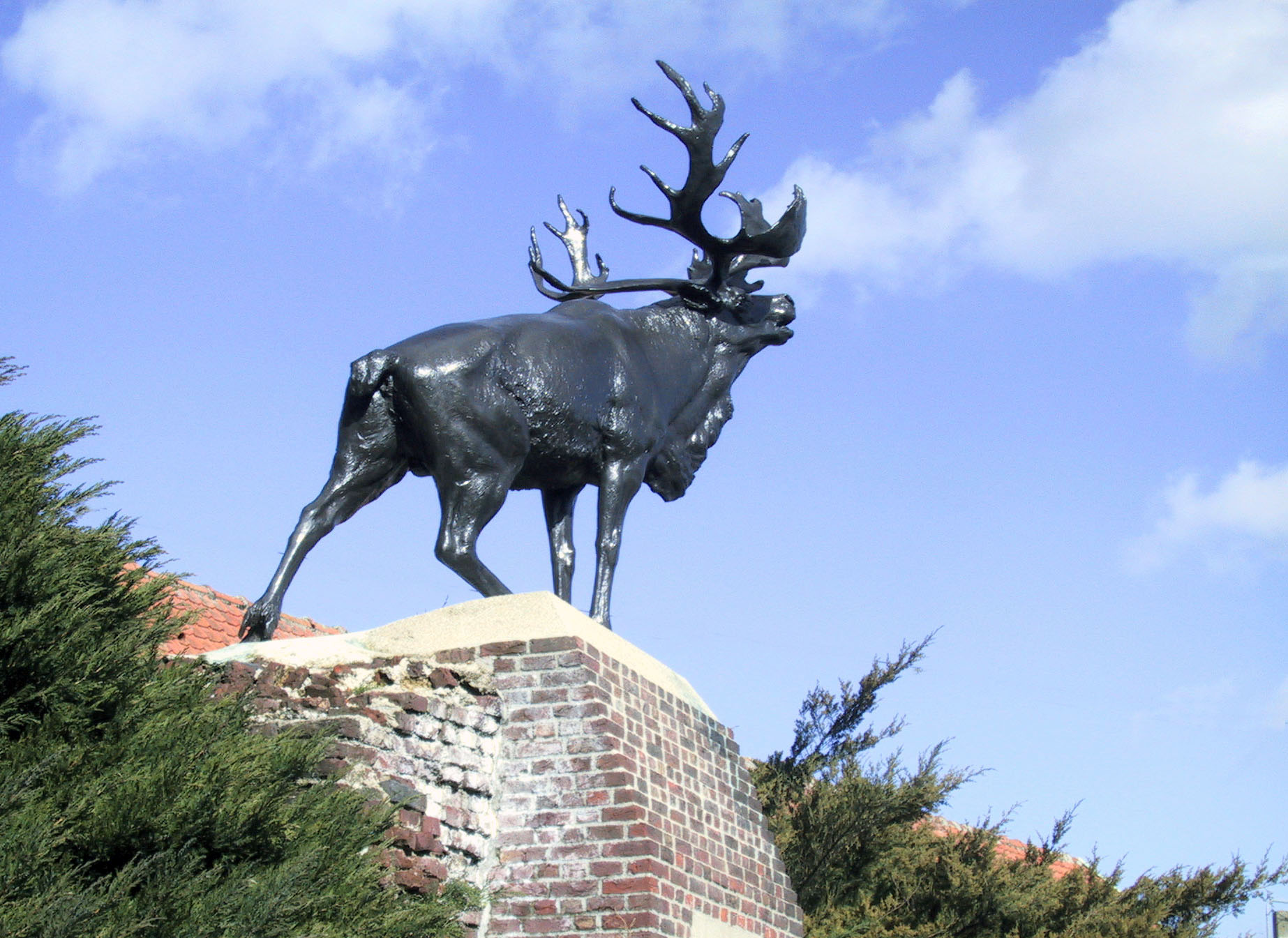
The Caribou at Monchy Le Preux

=== The Bourlon Wood Memorial ===
The Bourlon Wood Memorial commemorates the attack by Canadian Forces on the Canal du Nord in 1918. It lies beyond the village of Bourlon and reads

"The Canadian Corps on 27th September 1918 forced the Canal du Nord and captured this hill. They took Cambrai, Denain, Valenciennes and Mons; Then marched to the Rhine with the victorious Allies"

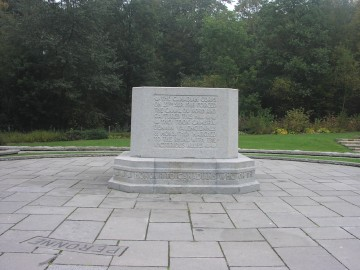
The Bourlon Wood Memorial

After leaving the Amiens front, the Canadian Corps liberated 54 towns and villages on some 3000 square kilometres (1158 square miles) of French soil, but in the process suffered more than 20,000 casualties. The Bourlon Wood Memorial commemorates the attack by Canadian Forces on the Canal du Nord.

The Canadian Battlefield Monument Commission, established after the Great War, was appointed to select the location and design of the memorials to commemorate Canadian participation in the First World War. The Canadian National Vimy Memorial at Vimy Ridge was selected as the national memorial site and seven other locations at Hill 62, St. Julien and Passchendaele in Belgium, as well as Le Quesnel, Dury, Courcelette and Bourlon Wood in France were chosen to commemorate significant battles the Canadian Expeditionary Force had engaged in. Each of the seven sites were to have an identical granite block inscribed with a brief description of the battle in both English and French.

=== Bullecourt Memorial Park ===
Bullecourt had seen two battles. The first Battle of Bullecourt took place on 11 April 1917 and saw the decimation of the Australian 4th Division. The second Battle of Bullecourt took place on 8 May 1917 and saw Australian success when the Germans retreated on 20 May. The Australians had been critical of General Gough's strategy of throwing troops at the German Hindenburg Line, and the view has been expressed that it was Bullecourt which was to cause the massive erosion of the trust of the Australians in their British commanders. The remains of many thousands of Australians lie in the area. Below is a photograph the "Digger" memorial which commemorates the sacrifice of Australian soldiers during the Battle of Arras.

=== The Slouch Hat Memorial ===
Around the corner from the "Digger" memorial is a further commemoration of Australian sacrifices in this area. This remembers the officers and men who died but have no known grave.

Also at Bullecourt is the Slouch Hat Memorial which commemorates those Australian and British soldiers who fell in the area in April and May 1917. The memorial displays the badge of the Australian Imperial Force together with the divisional signs of the three British divisions involved at Bullecourt.

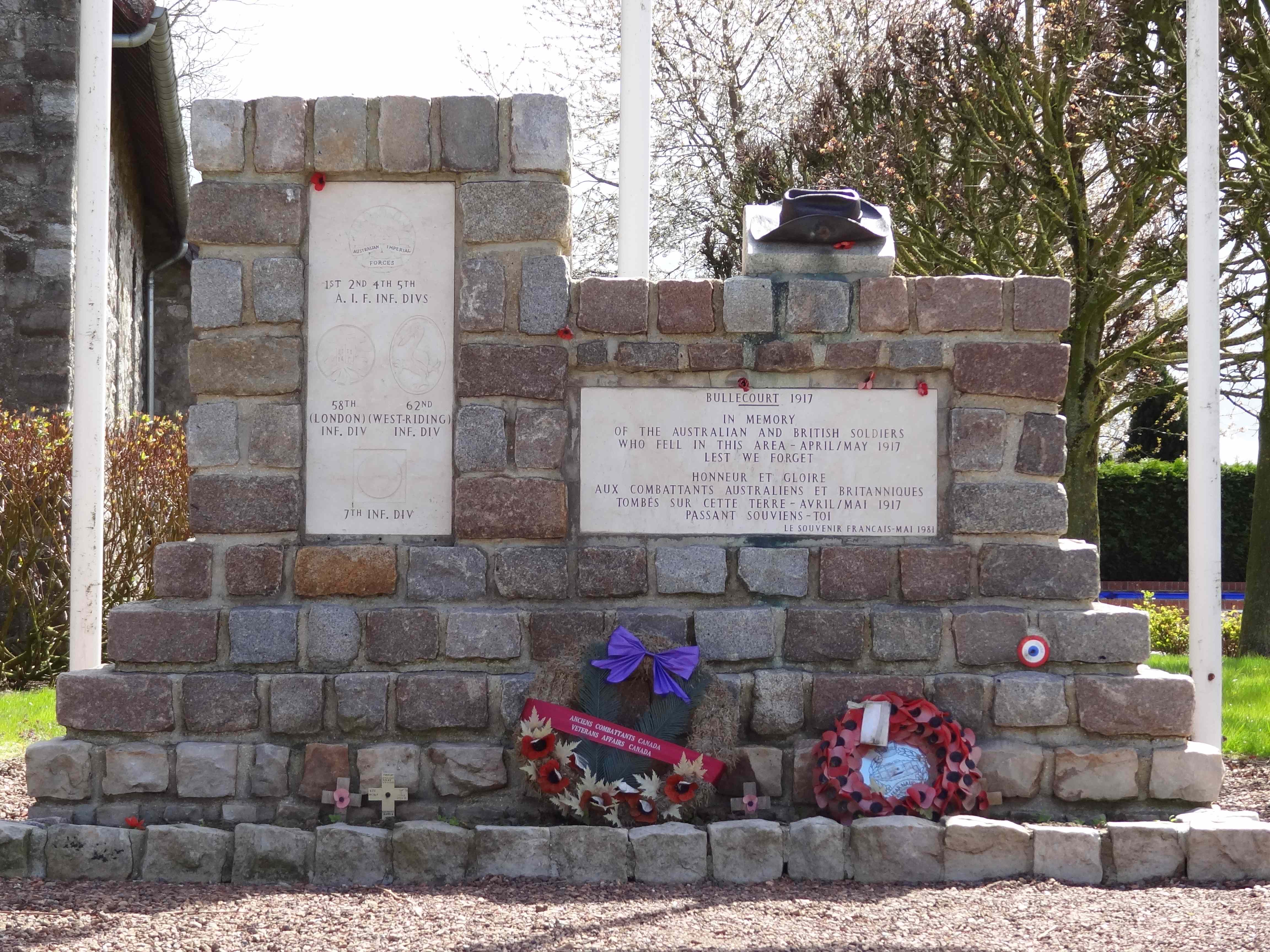
The Slouch Hat Memorial

=== The Vis-en-Artois Memorial and Cemetery ===
The Vis-en-Artois British Cemetery and the Vis-en-Artois Memorial are located on the main road between Arras and Cambrai. The memorial records the names of 9,903 officers and men of the forces of Great Britain, Ireland, and South Africa who were lost between 8 August 1918 and 11 November 1918 in the final Allied advances in Picardy and Artois, whose bodies were never found, and thus have no known grave. The soldiers of Australia and New Zealand are remembered elsewhere. The architect/designer of the memorial was J. R. Truelove, a former captain in the London Regiment, who also designed the Le Touret Memorial. Amongst those commemorated at Vis-en-Artois are three Victoria Cross winners, Chief Petty Officer George Prowse, Lance Corporal Allan Leonard Lewis and Sergeant Frederick Charles Riggs. The Memorial consists of a screen wall in three parts. The middle part of the screen wall is concave and carries stone panels on which names are carved. It is 26 feet (7.9 m) high flanked by pylons 70 feet (21 m) high. The Stone of Remembrance stands exactly between the pylons and behind it, in the middle of the screen, is a relief carving by Ernest Gillick representing St George and the Dragon. The screen walls to either side of that in the centre are also curved and carry stone panels carved with further names. Each of them forms the back of a roofed colonnade; and at the far end of each is a small building. The memorial was unveiled by The Rt Hon. Thomas Shaw on 4 August 1930.

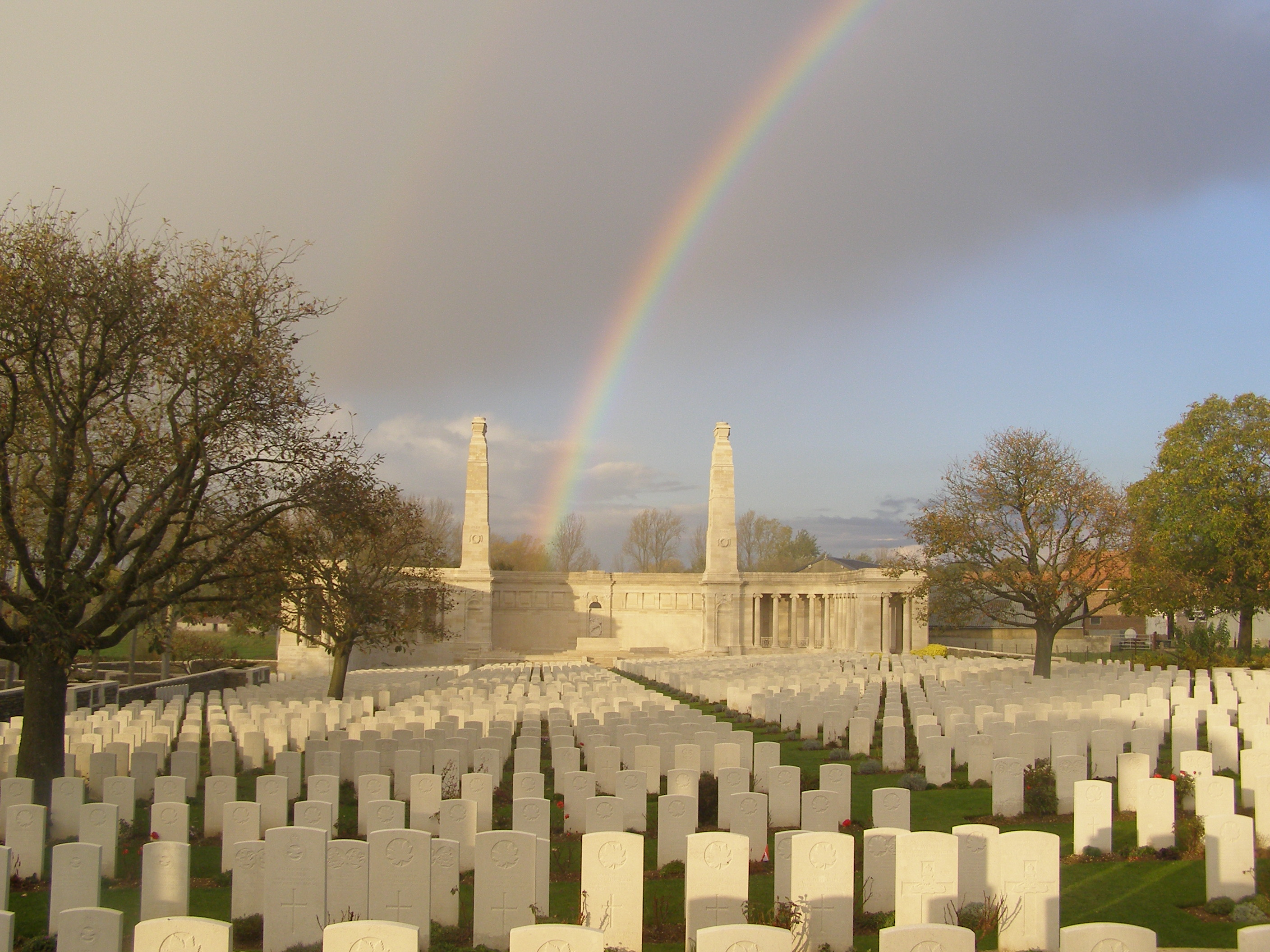
The Vis-en-Artois Memorial. The rainbow caught in the photograph meets the memorial just to the left of Gillick's relief.

== Miscellaneous Images ==
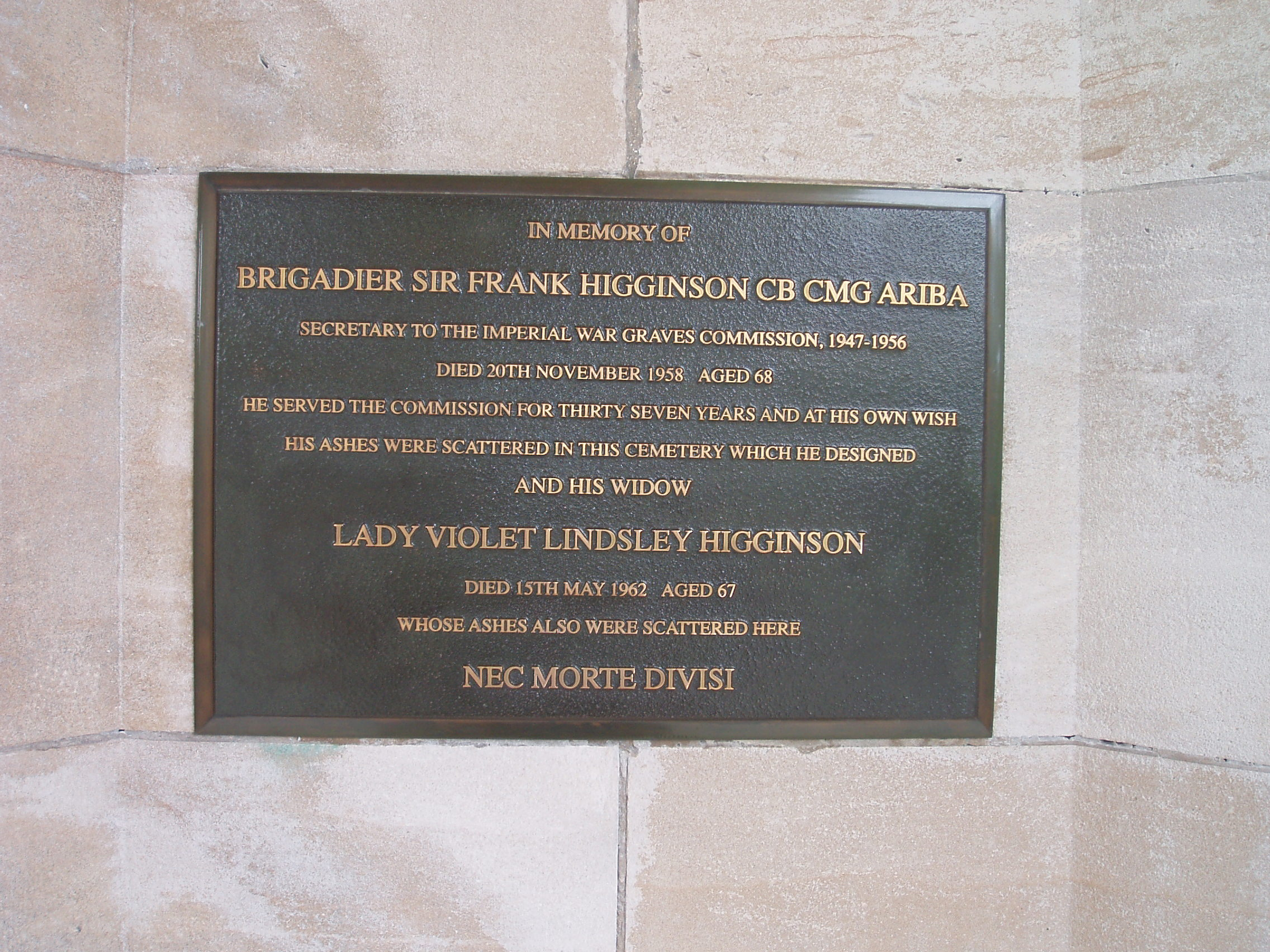
Plaque at Cabaret Rouge gives details about Frank Higginson the architect of the cemetery.

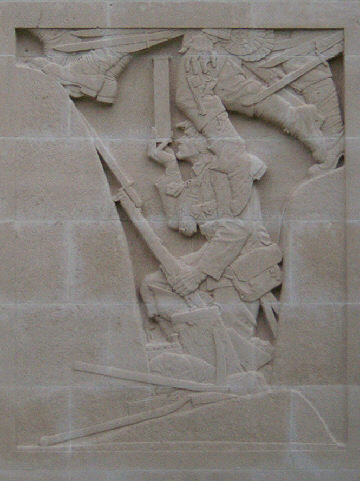
One of Charles Sergeant Jagger's reliefs on the Cambrai Memorial. A soldier uses a periscope in a trench.

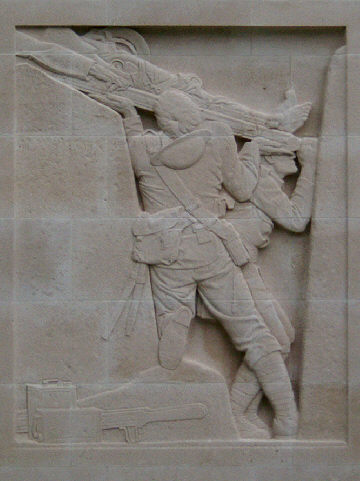
The second of Charles Sergeant Jagger's reliefs at Cambrai. A wounded man is lifted from the trenches.

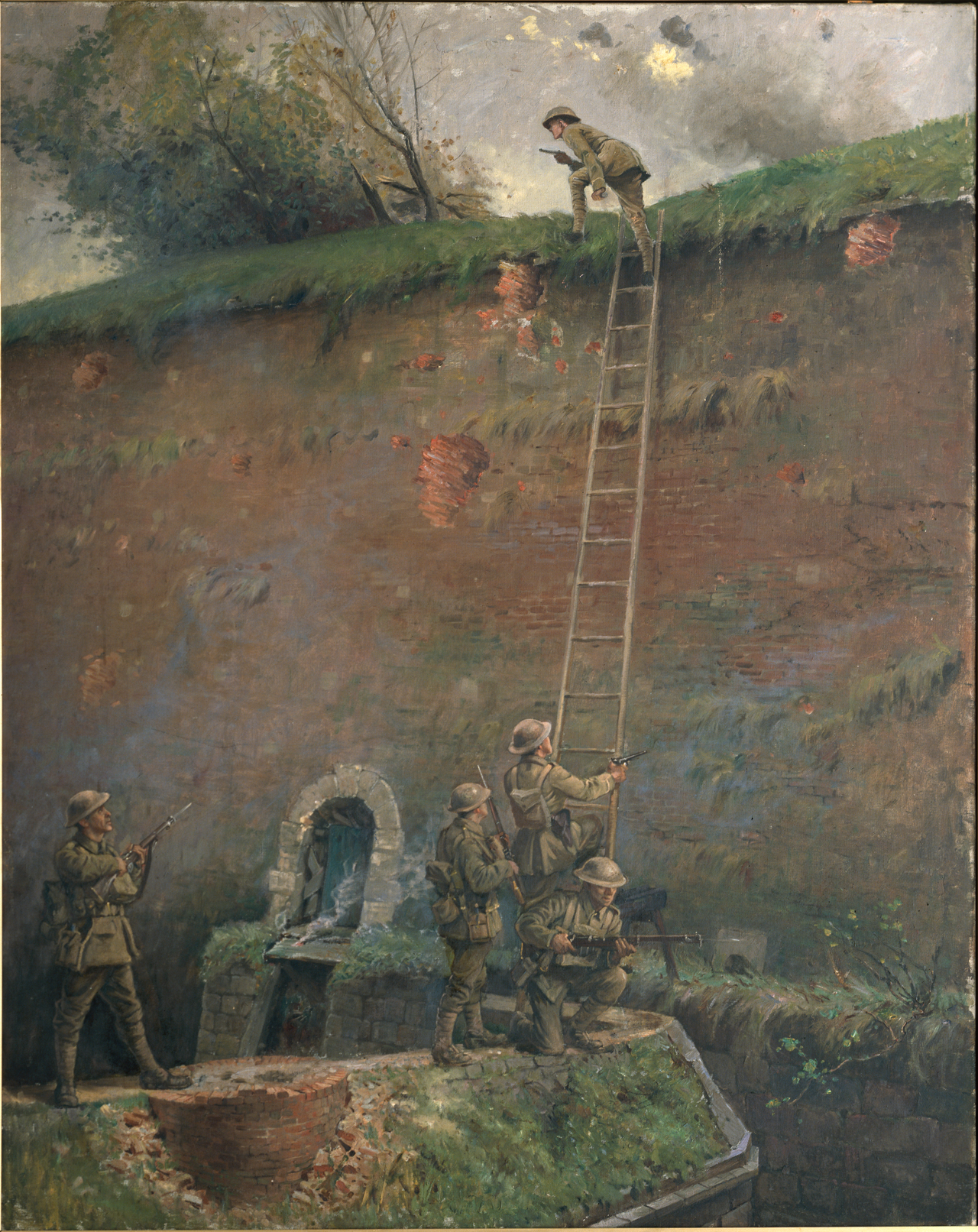
The painter George Edmund Butler's oil painting The Scaling of the Walls of Le Quesnoy. The New Zealand troops' last major action of the First World War was the capture of Le Quesnoy in November 1918, a week before the armistice. They scaled ladders set against the ancient walls of the old fortress town.

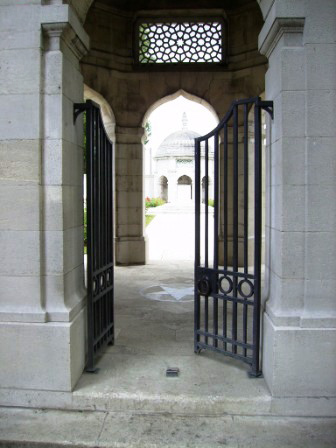
View through the entrance to the Indian Memorial to the Missing at Neuve Chapelle. In the distance is one of the memorial's two Chattri.

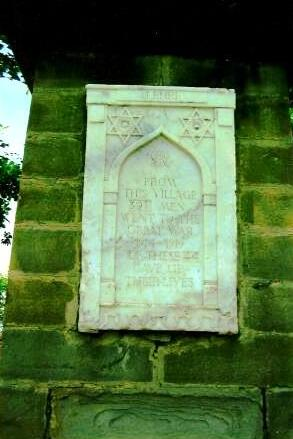
A memorial in the village of Lehri in the district of Jhelum, which lies about a half hours drive from Islamabad in Northern Punjab. The memorial records that 391 men from Lehri went off to fight in the 1914-1918 war and of these 44 "gave up their lives". This would have been one of the many memorials erected as a consequence of the Simla directive.

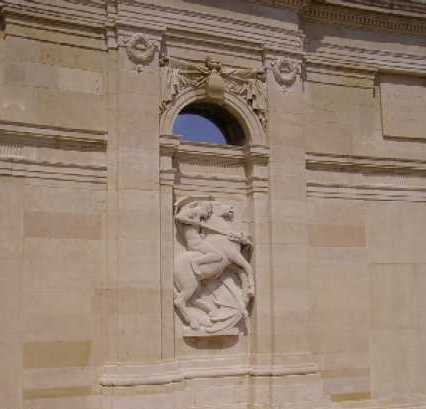
Ernest Gillick's relief depicting St George fighting the dragon on the Vis-en-Artois Memorial to the Missing.

== See also ==
- List of World War I Memorials and Cemeteries in Alsace
- List of World War I memorials and cemeteries in the Argonne
- List of World War I memorials and cemeteries in Champagne-Ardennes
- List of World War I memorials and cemeteries in Flanders
- List of World War I Memorials and Cemeteries in Lorraine
- List of World War I memorials and cemeteries in the Somme
- List of World War I memorials and cemeteries in Verdun
- List of World War I memorials and cemeteries in the area of the St Mihiel salient
