= Canadian Battlefield Memorials Restoration Project =

Canadian restoration project

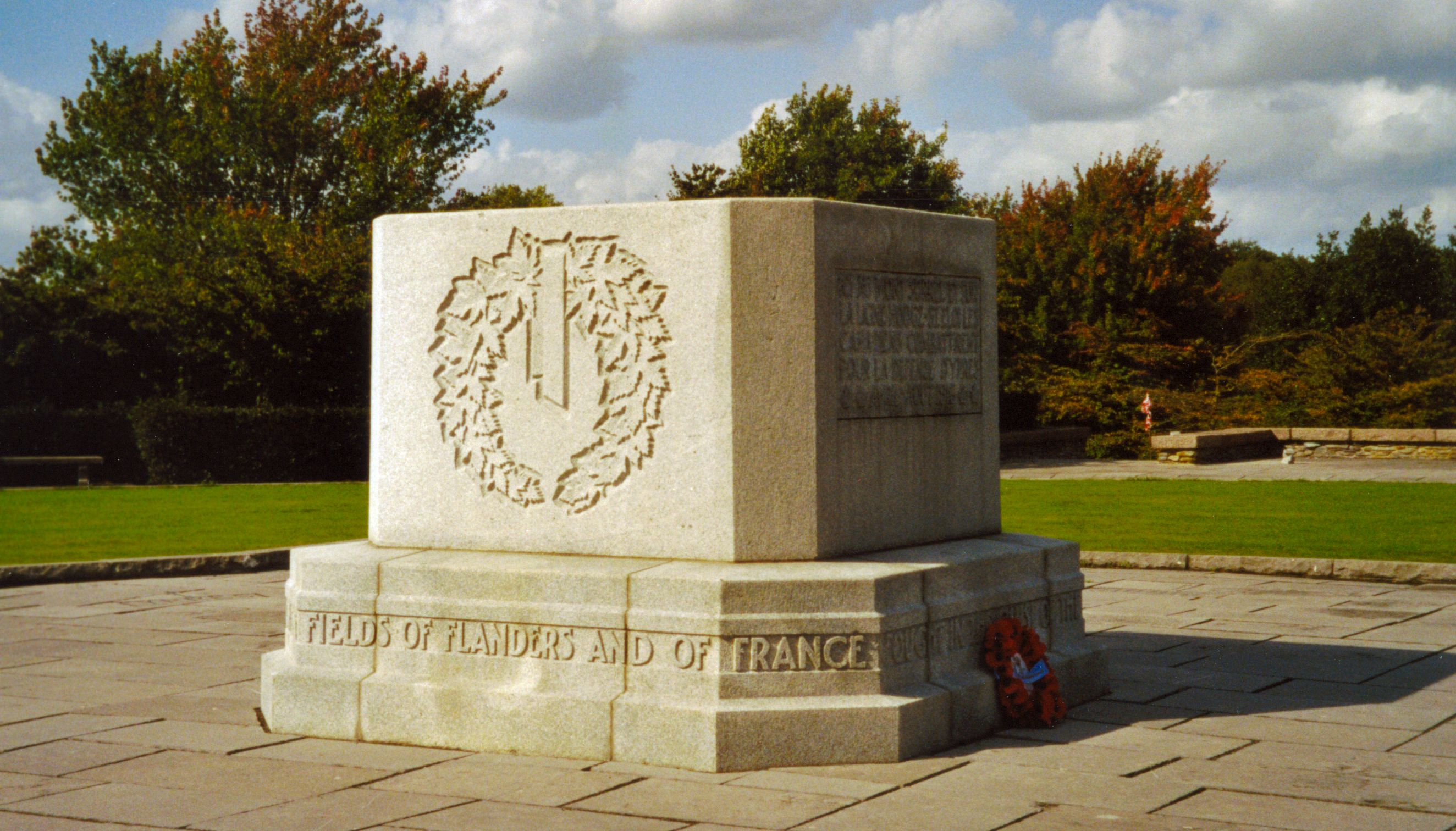
The Canadian Memorial at Hill 62

The Canadian Battlefield Memorials Restoration Project was a C$30-million Government of Canada capital project that aimed to restore and rehabilitate Canada's memorial sites in France and Belgium, in order to maintain and present them in a respectful and dignified manner.

== Project ==
Canada's thirteen World War I memorials were erected to honour and remember the achievements and sacrifices of Canadians and Newfoundlanders during the Great War. Collectively, these memorials are symbolic of the Canadians and Newfoundlanders who gave their lives during the First World War, and are physical reminders that their sacrifices and victories must never be forgotten.

In May 2001, the Government of Canada announced the $30-million restoration project. The repair work required to rehabilitate these memorial sites, now an average of 75 years old, is beyond the scope of routine maintenance. The program of work is being carried out in collaboration with Public Works and Government Services Canada, the Commonwealth War Graves Commission and other specialists, consultants and military historians. The work is separated into four project areas, with the restoration of the Canadian National Vimy Memorial being the main priority.

On April 2, 2007 restoration of the last memorial site, the Canadian National Vimy Memorial, was officially completed and the site was re-opened to the public.

== Restored memorials ==
Eight of these memorials stand on notable Canadian battlefields in France and Belgium

- Vimy Ridge Memorial - Canadian Veterans' Affairs web page
- Bourlon Wood Memorial - Canadian Veterans' Affairs web page
- Courcelette Memorial - Canadian Veterans' Affairs web page
- Dury Memorial - Canadian Veterans' Affairs web page
- Hill 62 Memorial - Canadian Veterans' Affairs web page
- Le Quesnel Memorial - Canadian Veterans' Affairs web page
- Passchendaele Memorial - Canadian Veterans' Affairs web page
- Saint Julien Memorial - Canadian Veterans' Affairs web page

Five other memorials mark places of historical significance to the then Dominion of Newfoundland

- Beaumont-Hamel - Canadian Veterans' Affairs web page
- Gueudecourt (Newfoundland) Memorial - Canadian Veterans' Affairs web page
- Monchy-le-Preux - Canadian Veterans' Affairs web page
- Masnières - Canadian Veterans' Affairs web page
- Courtrai - Canadian Veterans' Affairs web page
