= Canadian National Vimy Memorial =

Memorial in Pas-de-Calais, France

Canadian National Vimy Memorial Mémorial national du Canada à Vimy
- Veterans Affairs Canada; Commonwealth War Graves Commission
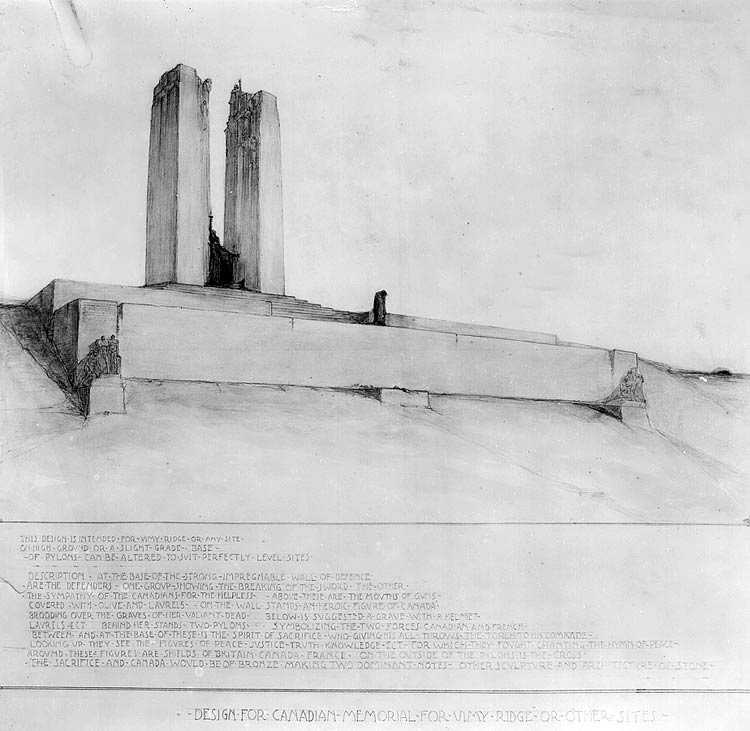
- Walter Allward's memorial design submission
- For First World War Canadian dead and missing, presumed dead, in France
- Unveiled: 26 July 1936; 90 years ago By King Edward VIII
- Location: 50°22′46″N 2°46′25″E near Vimy, Pas-de-Calais, France
- Designed by: Walter Seymour Allward
- Commemorated: 11,169 (Note: It is not possible to remove the names of those whose bodies have been discovered or identified since the construction of the memorial. As a result, several individuals are commemorated on both the memorial and by a headstone. Although 11,285 names appear on the memorial, only 11,169 are commemorated as missing.)
- To the valour of their countrymen in the Great War and in memory of their sixty thousand dead this monument is raised by the people of Canada. French: À la vaillance de ses fils pendant la Grande Guerre et en mémoire de ses soixante mille morts, le peuple canadien a élevé ce monument.

National Historic Site of Canada
- Official name: Vimy Ridge National Historic Site of Canada
- Designated: 1996

UNESCO World Heritage Site
- Official name: Funerary and memory sites of the First World War (Western Front)
- Type: Cultural
- Criteria: i, ii, vi
- Designated: 2023 (45th session)
- Reference no.: 1567-PC03

The Canadian National Vimy Memorial is a war memorial site in France dedicated to the memory of Canadian Expeditionary Force members killed during the First World War. It also serves as the place of commemoration for Canadian soldiers of the First World War killed or presumed dead in France who have no known grave. The monument is the centrepiece of a 100-hectare (250-acre) preserved battlefield park that encompasses a portion of the ground over which the Canadian Corps made their assault during the initial Battle of Vimy Ridge offensive of the Battle of Arras.

The Battle of Vimy Ridge was the first time all four divisions of the Canadian Expeditionary Force participated in a battle as a cohesive formation, and it became a Canadian national symbol of achievement and sacrifice. France ceded to Canada the perpetual use of a portion of land on Vimy Ridge on the understanding that Canada use the land to establish a battlefield park and memorial. Wartime tunnels, trenches, craters, and unexploded munitions still honeycomb the grounds of the site, which remains largely closed off for reasons of public safety. Along with preserved trench lines, several other memorials and cemeteries are contained within the park.

The project took designer Walter Seymour Allward eleven years to build. King Edward VIII unveiled it on 26 July 1936 in the presence of French President Albert Lebrun and a crowd of over 50,000 people, including 6,200 attendees from Canada. Following an extensive multi-year restoration, Queen Elizabeth II re-dedicated the monument on 9 April 2007 at a ceremony commemorating the 90th anniversary of the battle. The site is maintained by Veterans Affairs Canada. The Vimy Memorial is one of only two National Historic Sites of Canada located outside the country, the other being the Beaumont-Hamel Newfoundland Memorial.

== Background ==
=== Topography ===
Vimy Ridge is a gradually rising escarpment on the western edge of the Douai Plains, eight kilometres (5.0 mi) northeast of Arras. The ridge gradually rises on its western side, dropping more quickly on the eastern side. The ridge is approximately seven kilometres (4.3 mi) in length, 700 metres (2,300 ft) wide at its narrowest point, and culminates at an elevation of 145 metres (476 ft) above sea level, or 60 metres (200 ft) above the Douai Plains, providing a natural unobstructed view for tens of kilometres in all directions.

=== Vimy Ridge 1914–1916 ===
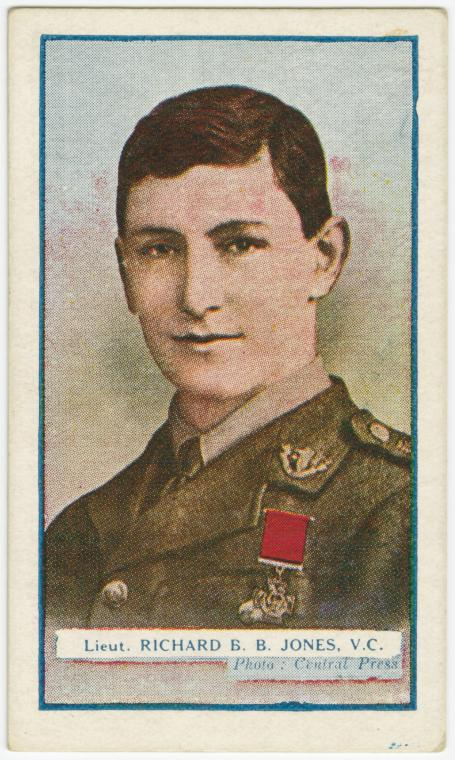
Victoria Cross recipient Lieutenant Richard Jones

The ridge fell under German control in October 1914, during the Race to the Sea, as the Franco-British and German forces continually attempted to outflank each other through northeastern France. The French Tenth Army attempted to dislodge the Germans from the region during the Second Battle of Artois in May 1915 by attacking their positions at Vimy Ridge and Notre Dame de Lorette. During the attack, the French 1st Moroccan Division briefly captured the height of the ridge, where the Vimy memorial is currently located, but was unable to hold it owing to a lack of reinforcements. The French made another attempt during the Third Battle of Artois in September 1915, but were once again unsuccessful in capturing the top of the ridge. The French suffered approximately 150,000 casualties in their attempts to gain control of Vimy Ridge and surrounding territory.

The British XVII Corps relieved the French Tenth Army from the sector in February 1916. On 21 May 1916, the German infantry conducted the German attack on Vimy Ridge along a 1,800 m (5,900 ft) front to force them from positions along the base of the ridge. The Germans captured several British-controlled tunnels and mine craters before halting their advance and entrenching their positions. (Note: The Germans grew uneasy about the proximity of the British positions to the top of the ridge, particularly after the increase in British tunnelling and counter mining activities.) Temporary Lieutenant Richard Jones was posthumously awarded the Victoria Cross for his ultimately unsuccessful defence of the Broadmarsh Crater during the attack. (Note: The Broadmarsh Crater remains visible and is located within the grounds of the Canadian National Vimy Memorial Park.) British counter-attacks on 22 May did not manage to change the situation. The Canadian Corps relieved IV Corps stationed along the western slopes of Vimy Ridge in October 1916.

=== Battle of Vimy Ridge ===
The Battle of Vimy Ridge was the first instance in which all four Canadian divisions participated in a battle together, as a cohesive formation. The nature and size of the planned Canadian Corps assault necessitated support and resources beyond its normal operational capabilities. Consequently, the British 5th Infantry Division and supplementary artillery, engineer and labour units reinforced the four Canadian divisions already in place. The 24th British Division of I Corps supported the Canadian Corps along its northern flank while the XVII Corps did so to the south. The ad hoc Gruppe Vimy formation, based under I Bavarian Reserve Corps commander General der Infanterie Karl Ritter von Fasbender, was the principal defending formation with three divisions responsible for manning the frontline defences opposite the Canadian Corps.

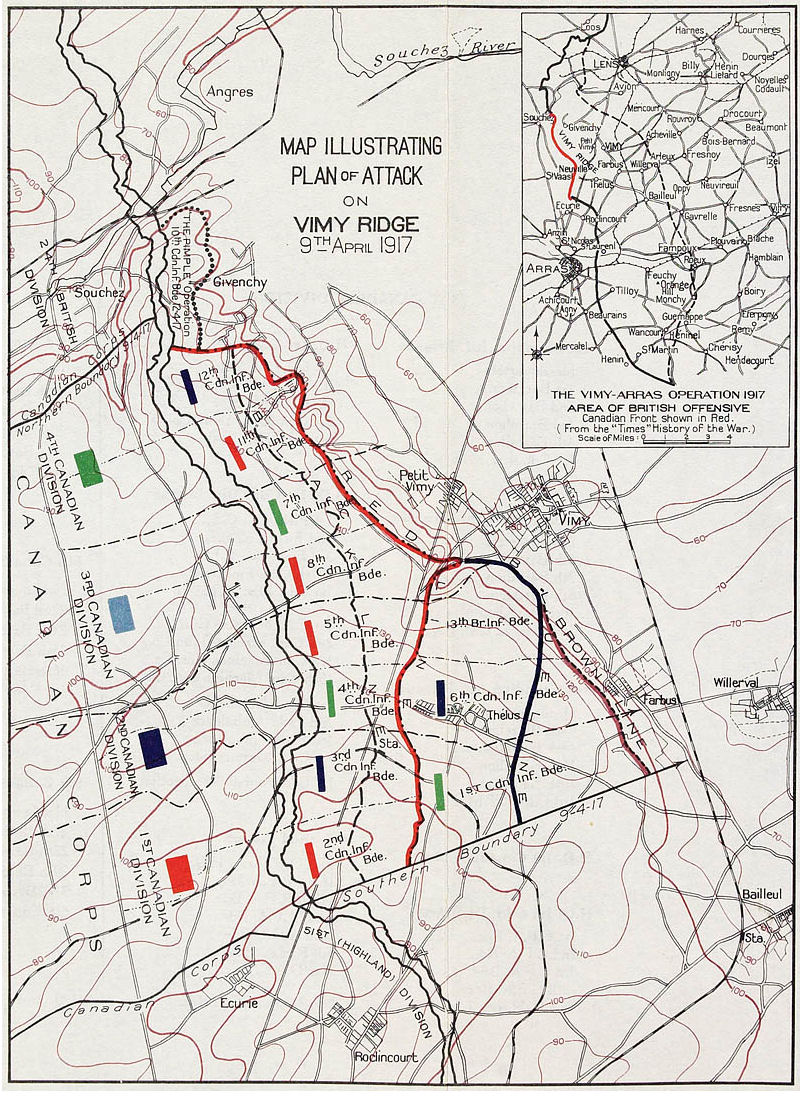
The Canadian Corps plan of attack outlining the four objective lines – Black, Red, Blue, and Brown

The attack began at 5:30 am on Easter Monday, 9 April 1917. Light field guns laid down a barrage that advanced in predetermined increments, often 91 metres (100 yd) every three minutes, while medium and heavy howitzers established a series of standing barrages against known defensive systems further ahead. The 1st, 2nd, and 3rd Canadian Divisions quickly captured their first objectives. The 4th Canadian Division encountered a great deal of trouble during its advance and was unable to complete its first objective until some hours later. The 1st, 2nd, and 3rd Canadian Divisions captured their second objective by approximately 7:30 am. The failure of the 4th Canadian Division to capture the top of the ridge delayed further advances and forced the 3rd Canadian Division to expend resources establishing a defensive line to its north. Reserve units from the 4th Canadian Division renewed the attack on the German positions on the top of the ridge and eventually forced the German troops holding the southwestern portion of Hill 145 to withdraw. (Note: German records indicate that the defending German units withdrew because they had fully run out of ammunition, mortar rounds, and grenades.)

On the morning of 10 April, Canadian Corps commander Lieutenant-General Julian Byng moved up three fresh brigades to support the continued advance. The fresh units leapfrogged units already in place and captured the third objective line, including Hill 135 and the town of Thélus, by 11:00 am. By 2:00 pm both the 1st and 2nd Canadian Divisions reported capturing their final objectives. By this point the "Pimple", a heavily defended knoll west of the town of Givenchy-en-Gohelle, was the only German position remaining on Vimy Ridge. On 12 April, the 10th Canadian Brigade attacked and quickly overcame the hastily entrenched German troops, with the support of artillery and the 24th British Division. By nightfall on 12 April, the Canadian Corps was in firm control of the ridge. The Canadian Corps suffered 10,602 casualties: 3,598 killed and 7,004 wounded. The German Sixth Army suffered an unknown number of casualties, and around 4,000 men became prisoners of war.

Although the battle is not generally considered Canada's greatest military feat of arms, the image of national unity and achievement imbued the battle with considerable national significance for Canada. According to Pierce, "the historical reality of the battle has been reworked and reinterpreted in a conscious attempt to give purpose and meaning to an event that came to symbolize Canada's coming of age as a nation." The idea that Canada's identity and nationhood were born out of the battle is an opinion that is widely held in military and general histories of Canada.

== History ==
=== Selection ===
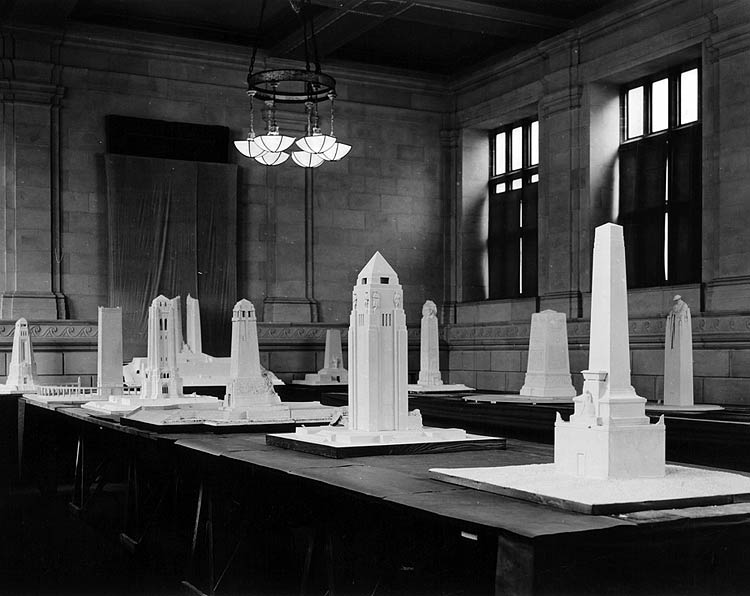
Design competition submissions

In 1920, the Government of Canada announced that the Imperial War Graves Commission had awarded Canada eight sites—five in France and three in Belgium—on which to erect memorials. (Note: The eight sites were Vimy, Bourlon Wood, Le Quesnel, Dury, and Courcelette in France and St. Julien, Hill 62 (Sanctuary Wood), and Passchendaele in Belgium.) Each site represented a significant Canadian engagement, and the Canadian government initially decided that each battlefield be treated equally and commemorated with identical monuments. In September 1920, the Canadian government formed the Canadian Battlefields Memorials Commission to discuss the process and conditions for holding a memorial competition for the sites in Europe. The commission held its first meeting on 26 November 1920 and during this meeting decided that the architectural design competition would be open to all Canadian architects, designers, sculptors, and artists. The jury consisted of Charles Herbert Reilly representing the Royal Institute of British Architects, Paul Philippe Cret representing the Société centrale des architectes français and Frank Darling representing the Royal Architectural Institute of Canada. Each jury member was a leader in the architectural field; Reilly was training students in design and development of war memorials, and Cret had been selected by the United States to design national monuments in Europe. Interested parties submitted 160 design drawings, and the jury selected 17 submissions for consideration, commissioning each finalist to produce a plaster maquette of their respective design. The jury recommended in a 10 September 1921 report to the commission that two of the designs be executed. In October 1921, the commission formally selected the submission of Toronto sculptor and designer Walter Seymour Allward as the winner of the competition; the design submitted by Frederick Chapman Clemesha was selected as runner-up. Allward's other commissions included the national memorial commemorating Canada's participation in the South African War (1899–1902). The complexity of Allward's design precluded the possibility of duplicating the design at each site. The approach of selecting one primary memorial ran counter to the recommendation of Canadian Battlefields Memorials Commission architectural advisor Percy Erskine Nobbs, who had consistently expressed his preference for a series of smaller monuments. The consensus went in Allward's favour, his design receiving both public and critical approval. (Note: Critical approval included Group of Seven artist A. Y. Jackson providing a supporting position in a letter published by Canadian Forum.) The commission revised its initial plans and decided to build two distinctive memorials—those of Allward and Clemesha—and six smaller identical memorials.

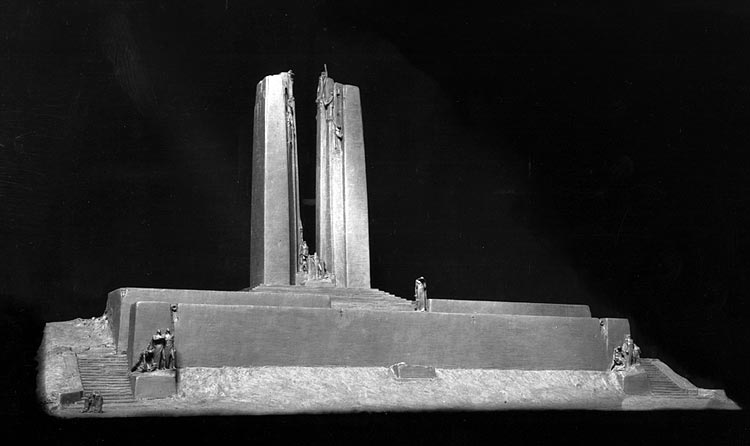
A design model of the memorial

At the outset, members of the commission debated where to build Allward's winning design. The jury's assessment was that Allward's submission was best suited to a "low hill rather than to a continuous and lofty bluff or cliff like Vimy Ridge". The commission committee initially recommended placing the monument in Belgium on Hill 62, near the location of the Battle of Mont Sorrel, as the site provided an imposing view. This ran counter to the desires of Prime Minister William Lyon Mackenzie King who, while speaking in the House of Commons of Canada in May 1922, argued in favour of placing the memorial at Vimy Ridge. King's position received the unanimous support of the House and, in the end, the commission selected Vimy Ridge as the preferred site. The government announced its desire to acquire a more considerable tract of land along the ridge after the commission selected Vimy Ridge as the preferred location for Allward's design. In the interval between the 1st and 2nd session of the 14th Canadian Parliament, Speaker of the House of Commons of Canada Rodolphe Lemieux went to France to negotiate the acquisition of more land. On 5 December 1922, Lemieux concluded an agreement with France in which France granted Canada "freely and for all time" the use of 100 hectares (250 acres) of land on Vimy Ridge, inclusive of Hill 145, in recognition of Canada's war effort. The only condition placed on the donation was that Canada use the land to erect a monument commemorating Canadian soldiers killed during the First World War and assume the responsibility for the maintenance of the memorial and the surrounding battlefield park.

=== Memorial construction ===
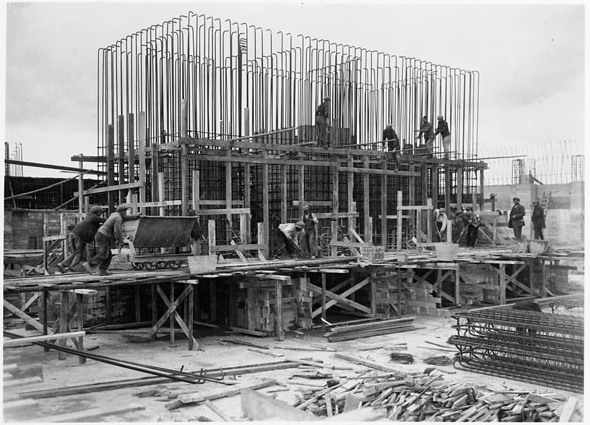
Laying the foundation of the memorial

Following the competition, Allward spent the remainder of 1921 and the spring of 1922 preparing for his move to Europe. After selling his home and studio, Allward finally departed for Belgium on 6 June 1922 and spent several months seeking a suitable studio in Belgium and then Paris, though he eventually set up a studio in London.

Allward had initially hoped to use white marble for the memorial's facing stone, but Percy Nobbs suggested this would be a mistake because marble was unlikely to weather well in northern France and the memorial would have a "ghost like" appearance. Allward undertook a tour of almost two years to find stone of the right colour, texture, and luminosity. He found it in the ruins of Diocletian's Palace at Split, Croatia; he observed that the palace had not weathered over the years, which Allward took as evidence of the stone's durability. His choice—Seget limestone—came from an ancient Roman quarry near Seget, Croatia. The difficulties with the quarrying process, coupled with complicated transportation logistics, delayed delivery of the limestone and thus construction of the memorial. The first shipment did not arrive at the site until 1927, and the larger blocks, intended for the human figures, did not begin to arrive until 1931.

On Allward's urging the Canadian Battlefields Memorials Commission hired Oscar Faber, a Danish structural engineer, in 1924 to prepare foundation plans and provide general supervision of the foundation work. Faber had recently designed the substructure for the Menin Gate at Ypres, and he selected a design that employed cast-in-place reinforced concrete to which the facing stone would be bonded. Major Unwin Simson served as the principal Canadian engineer during the construction of the memorial and oversaw much of the daily operations at the site. Allward moved to Paris in 1925 to supervise the construction and the carving of the sculptures. Construction commenced in 1925 and took eleven years to complete. The Imperial War Graves Commission concurrently employed French and British veterans to carry out the necessary roadwork and site landscaping.

While awaiting the first delivery of stone, Simson noticed that the battlefield landscape features were beginning to deteriorate. Seeing an opportunity to not only preserve a portion of the battlefield but also keep his staff occupied, Simson decided to preserve a short section of trench line and make the Grange Subway more accessible. Labourers rebuilt and preserved sections of sandbagged trench wall, on both the Canadian and German sides of the Grange crater group, in concrete. The workforce also built a new concrete entrance for the Grange Subway and, after excavating a portion of the tunnel system, installed electric lighting.

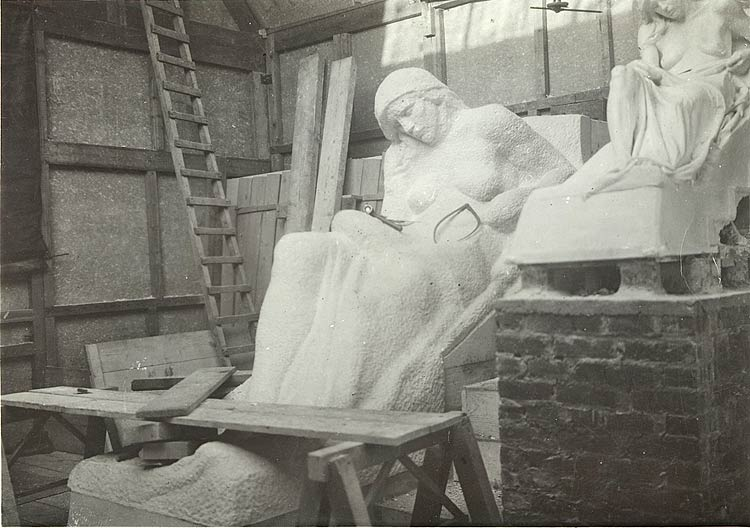
Statue carving in progress

Allward chose a relatively new construction method for the monument: limestone bonded to a cast concrete frame. A foundation bed of 11,000 tonnes of concrete, reinforced with hundreds of tonnes of steel, served as the support bed for the memorial. The memorial base and twin pylons contained almost 6,000 tonnes of Seget limestone. Sculptors carved the 20 approximately double life-sized human figures on site from large blocks of stone. The carvers used half-size plaster models produced by Allward in his studio, now on display at the Canadian War Museum, and an instrument called a pantograph to reproduce the figures at the proper scale. The carvers conducted their work year-round inside temporary studios built around each figure. The inclusion of the names of those killed in France with no known grave was not part of the original design, and Allward was unhappy when the government asked him to include them. (Note: The government was acting on behalf of a request by the Imperial War Graves Commission which was tasked with commemorating all killed and missing Commonwealth soldiers and was, as a result, prepared to share in the cost of the memorial.) Allward argued that the inclusion of names was not part of the original commissioning. Through a letter to the Canadian Battlefields Memorials Commission in October 1927, Allward indicated his intention to relegate the names of the missing to pavement stones around the monument. The collective dismay and uproar of the commission forced Allward to relent and incorporate the names of the missing on the memorial walls. The task of inscribing the names did not begin until the early 1930s and employed a typeface that Allward designed for the monument.

=== Pilgrimage and unveiling ===
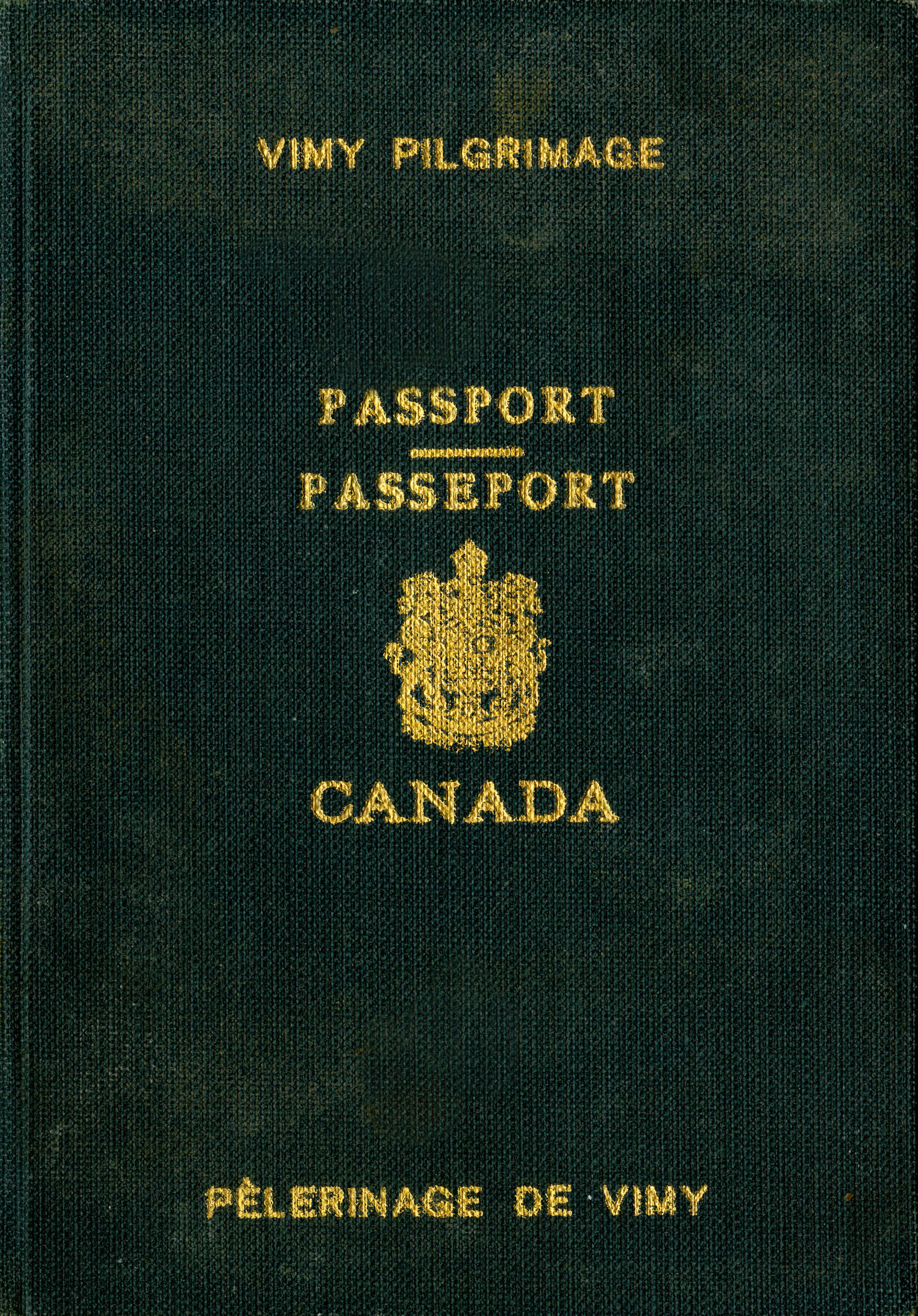
Special passport issued by Canada for the 1936 Vimy pilgrimage

In 1919, the year after the war ended, around 60,000 British tourists and mourners made pilgrimages to the Western Front. The transatlantic voyage was longer and more expensive from Canada; many attempts to organize large pilgrimages failed, and journeys overseas were largely made individually or in small, unofficial groups. The delegates of the 1928 national convention of the Canadian Legion passed a unanimous resolution asking that a pilgrimage be organized to the Western Front battlefields. A plan began to take form wherein the Legion aimed to coordinate the pilgrimage with the unveiling of the Vimy memorial, which at the time was expected to be completed in 1931 or 1932. Due to construction delays with the memorial, it was not until July 1934 that the Canadian Legion announced a pilgrimage to former battlefield sites in conjunction with the unveiling of the memorial. Although the exact date of the memorial unveiling was still not set, the Legion invited former service members to make tentative reservations with their headquarters in Ottawa. The response from veterans and their families was enthusiastic—1,200 inquiries by November 1934. The Legion presumptuously announced that the memorial would be unveiled on Dominion Day, 1 July 1936, even though the government still did not know when it would be completed.

For event planning purposes, the Legion and the government established areas for which each was responsible. The government was responsible for the selection of the official delegation and the program for the official unveiling of the memorial. The Legion was responsible for the more challenging task of organizing the pilgrimage. For the Legion, this included planning meals, accommodations and transportation for what was at the time the largest single peacetime movement of people from Canada to Europe. The Legion took the position that the pilgrimage would be funded by its members without subsidies or financial aid from Canadian taxpayers, and by early 1935 they had established that the price of the 3 1/2-week trip, inclusive of all meals, accommodation, health insurance, and sea and land transportation would be $160 per person ($3,443 as of 2023). Indirect assistance came in several forms. The government waived passport fees and made a special Vimy passport available to pilgrims at no extra cost. The government and private sector also provided paid leave for their participating employees. It was not until April 1936 that the government was prepared to publicly commit to an unveiling date, 26 July 1936. On 16 July, the five transatlantic liners, escorted by HMCS Champlain and HMCS Saguenay, departed the Port of Montreal with approximately 6,200 passengers and arrived in Le Havre on 24 and 25 July. (Note: The ships were SS Montrose, SS Montcalm, SS Antonia, SS Ascania and SS Duchess of Bedford.) The limited accommodation made it necessary for the Legion to lodge pilgrims in nine cities throughout northern France and Belgium and employ 235 buses to move the pilgrims between various locations.

It is an inspired expression in stone, chiselled by a skilful Canadian hand, of Canada's salute to her fallen sons.

— King Edward VIII referring to the memorial during his 1936 speech.

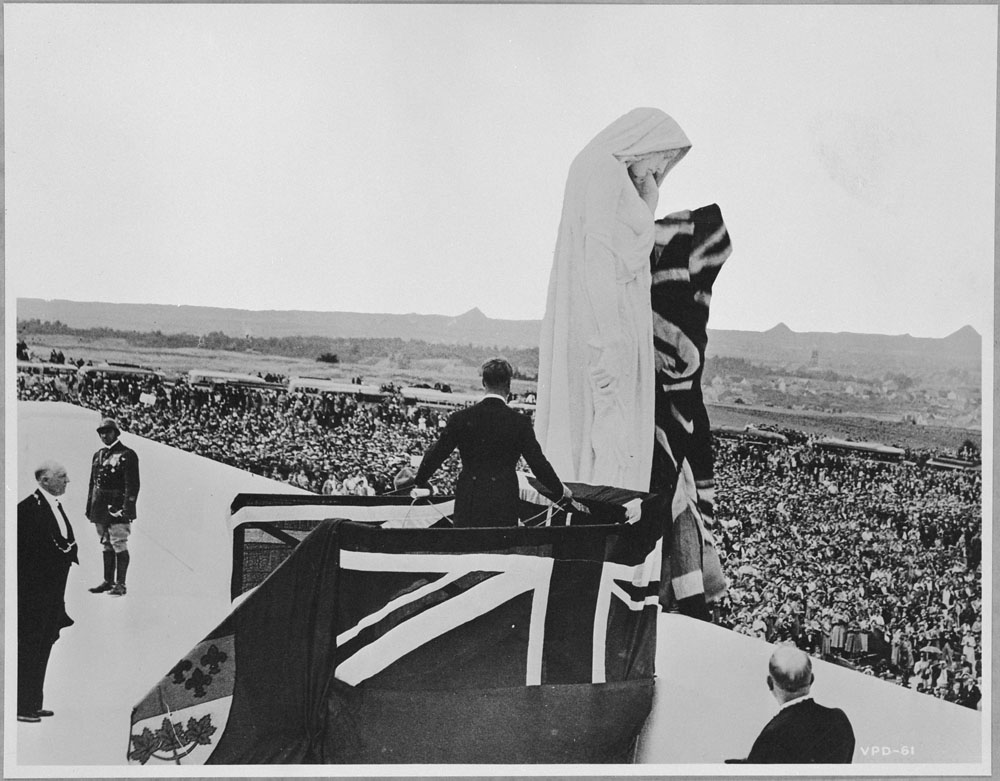
King Edward VIII unveiling the figure Canada Bereft on the Vimy Ridge Memorial

On 26 July, the day of the ceremony, pilgrims spent the morning and early afternoon exploring the landscape of the memorial park before congregating at the monument. For the ceremony, sailors from HMCS Saguenay provided the guard of honour. Also present were the Royal Canadian Horse Artillery Band, French army engineers, and French-Moroccan cavalry who had fought on the site during the Second Battle of Artois. The ceremony itself was broadcast live by the Canadian Radio Broadcasting Commission over shortwave radio, with facilities of the British Broadcasting Corporation transmitting the ceremony to Canada. Senior Canadian, British, and European officials, including French President Albert Lebrun and Prince Arthur of Connaught, and a crowd of over 50,000 attended the event. Prime Minister Mackenzie King was absent because he had not served in the war and had treated Lord Byng fairly harshly during the 1926 King-Byng Affair. He was also reluctant to meet veterans and felt that a war veteran in Cabinet should attend in his place. On the day, four government ministers and four Canadian general officers attended the unveiling.

Before the ceremony began, Edward VIII, present in his capacity as King of Canada, inspected the guard of honour, was introduced to the honoured guests, and spent approximately half an hour speaking with veterans in the crowd. Two Royal Air Force and two French Air Force squadrons flew over the monument and dipped their wings in salute. The ceremony itself began with prayers from chaplains representing the Church of England, the United Church of Canada, and the Roman Catholic Church. Ernest Lapointe, Canadian Minister of Justice, spoke first, followed by Edward VIII who, in both French and English, thanked France for its generosity and assured those assembled that Canada would never forget its war missing and dead. The King then pulled the Royal Union Flag from the central figure of Canada Bereft and the military band played the "Last Post". The ceremony was one of the King's few official duties before he abdicated the throne. The pilgrimage continued, and most participants toured Ypres before being taken to London to be hosted by the British Legion. One-third of the pilgrims left from London for Canada on 1 August, while the majority returned to France as guests of the government for another week of touring before going home.

=== Second World War ===
Hitler touring the Vimy Memorial in 1940

In 1939, the increased threat of conflict with Nazi Germany amplified the Canadian government's level of concern for the general safety of the memorial. Canada could do little more than protect the sculptures and the bases of the pylons with sandbags and await developments. When war did break out in September 1939, the British Expeditionary Force (BEF) deployed to France and assumed responsibility for the Arras sector, which included Vimy. In late May 1940, following the British retreat to Dunkirk after the Battle of Arras, the status and condition of the memorial became unknown to Allied forces. The Germans took control of the site and held the site's caretaker, George Stubbs, in an Ilag internment camp for Allied civilians in St. Denis, France. The rumoured destruction of the Vimy Memorial, either during the fighting or at the hands of the Germans, was widely reported in Canada and the United Kingdom. The rumours led the German Ministry of Public Enlightenment and Propaganda to formally deny accusations that Germany had damaged or desecrated the memorial. To demonstrate the memorial had not been desecrated, Adolf Hitler, who reportedly admired the memorial for its peaceful nature, was photographed by the press while personally touring it and the preserved trenches on 2 June 1940. The undamaged state of the memorial was not confirmed until September 1944 when British troops of the 2nd Battalion, the Welsh Guards of the Guards Armoured Division, recaptured Vimy Ridge.

=== Post-war years ===
Immediately following the Second World War, very little attention was paid to the Battle of Vimy Ridge or the Vimy Memorial. The Winnipeg Free Press and The Legionary, the magazine of the Royal Canadian Legion, were the only publications to note the 35th anniversary of the battle in 1952. The 40th anniversary in 1957 received even less notice, with only the Halifax Herald making any mention. Interest in commemoration remained low in the early 1960s but increased in 1967 with the 50th anniversary of the battle, paired with the Canadian Centennial. A heavily attended ceremony at the memorial in April 1967 was broadcast live on television. Commemoration of the battle decreased once again throughout the 1970s and only returned in force with the 125th anniversary of Canadian Confederation and the widely covered 75th anniversary of the battle in 1992. The 1992 ceremony at the memorial was attended by Canadian Prime Minister Brian Mulroney and at least 5,000 people. Subsequent smaller-scale ceremonies were held at the memorial in 1997 and 2002.

=== Restoration and rededication ===
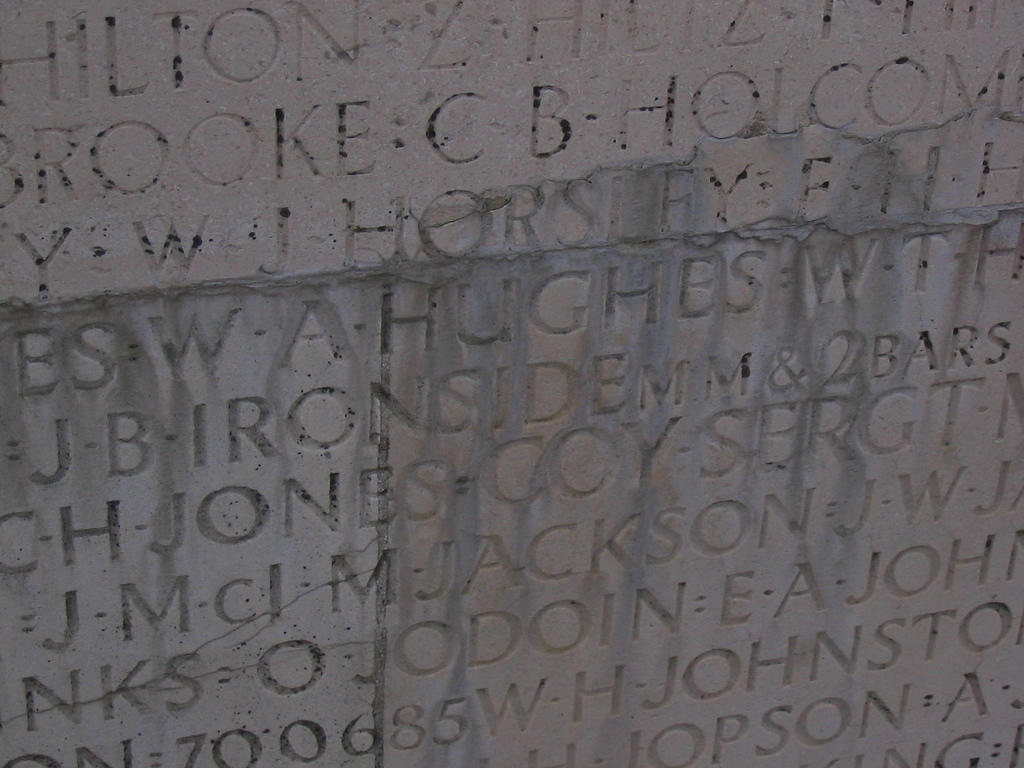
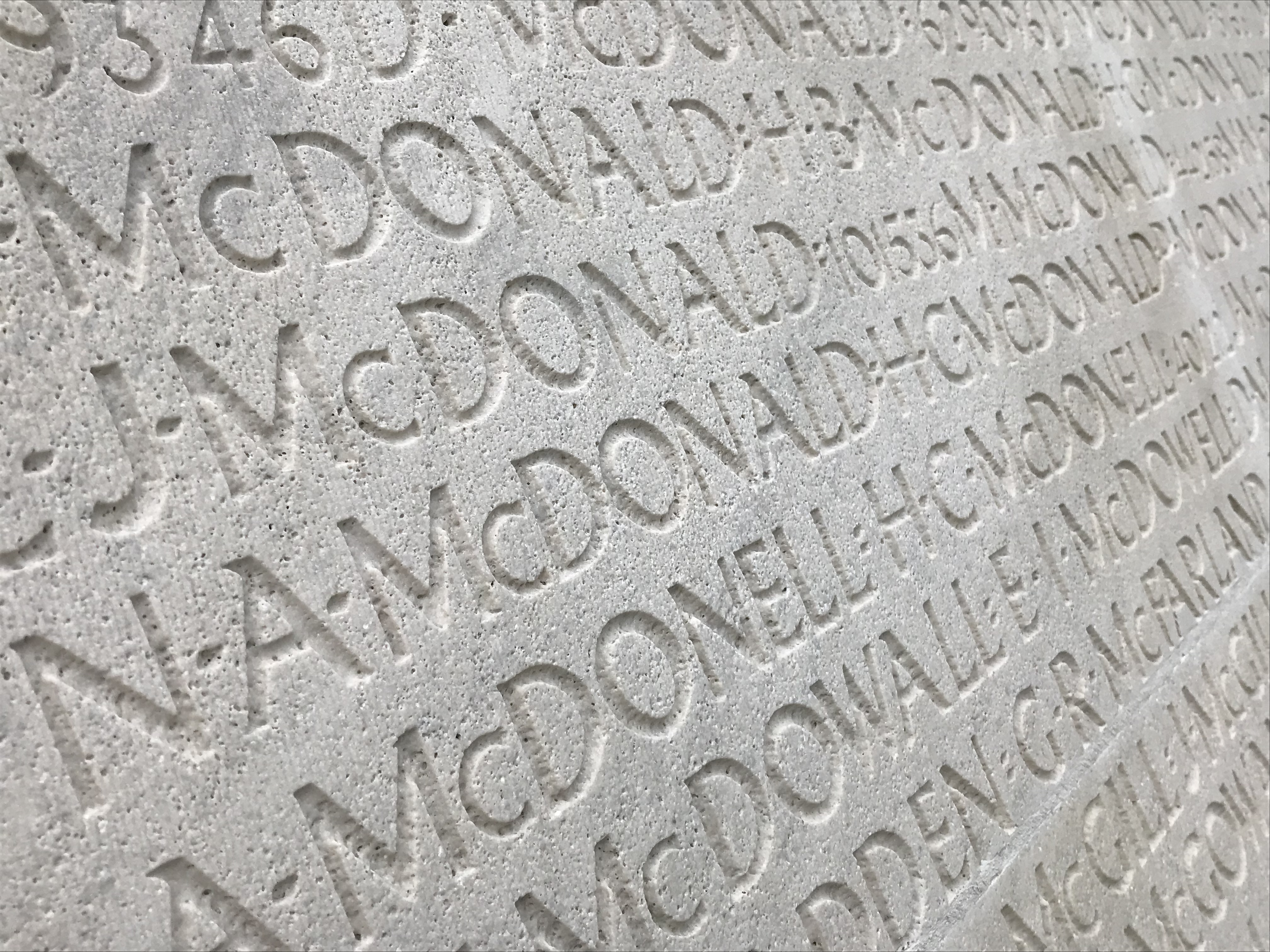
Name panels before and after restoration

By the end of the century, the many repairs undertaken since the memorial's construction had left a patchwork of materials and colours, and a disconcerting pattern of damage from water intrusion at the joints. In May 2001, the Government of Canada announced the Canadian Battlefield Memorials Restoration Project, a major CA$30 million restoration project to restore Canada's memorial sites in France and Belgium, in order to maintain and present them in a respectful and dignified manner. In 2005, the Vimy memorial closed for major restoration work. Veterans Affairs Canada directed the restoration of the memorial in cooperation with other Canadian departments, the Commonwealth War Graves Commission, consultants and specialists in military history.

Time, wear, and severe weather conditions led to many identified problems, the single most pervasive being water damage. In building a memorial made of cast concrete covered in stone, Allward had failed to take into account how these materials would shift over time. The builders and designer failed to incorporate sufficient space between the concrete and stones, which resulted in water infiltrating the structure through its walls and platforms, dissolving lime in the concrete foundation and masonry. As the water exited, it deposited the lime on exterior surfaces, obscuring many of the names inscribed thereon. Poor drainage and water flows off the monument also caused significant deterioration of the platform, terrace, and stairs. The restoration project was intended to address the root causes of damage and included repairs to the stone, walkways, walls, terraces, stairs, and platforms. In order to respect Allward's initial vision of a seamless structure, the restoration team were required to remove all foreign materials employed in patchwork repairs, replace damaged stones with material from the original quarry in Croatia, and correct all minor displacement of stones caused by the freeze-thaw activity. Underlying structural flaws were also corrected. Queen Elizabeth II, escorted by Prince Philip, Duke of Edinburgh, rededicated the restored memorial on 9 April 2007 in a ceremony commemorating the 90th anniversary of the battle. Other senior Canadian officials, including Prime Minister Stephen Harper, and senior French representatives, Prime Minister Dominique de Villepin among them, attended the event, along with thousands of Canadian students, veterans of the Second World War and of more recent conflicts, and descendants of those who fought at Vimy. The crowd attending the rededication ceremony was the largest crowd on the site since the 1936 dedication.

=== Centennial commemoration ===
The centennial commemoration of the Battle of Vimy Ridge took place at the memorial on 9 April 2017, coincidentally during the Canadian sesquicentennial celebrations. Estimates before the event indicated that an audience of up to 30,000 would be present. The Mayor of Arras, Frédéric Leturque, thanked Canadians, along with Australians, Britons, New Zealanders and South Africans, for their role in the First World War battles in the area.

Attending dignitaries for Canada included Governor General David Johnston; Prince Charles; Prince William, Duke of Cambridge; Prince Harry; and Prime Minister Justin Trudeau. President François Hollande and Prime Minister Bernard Cazeneuve represented France. Elizabeth II issued a statement via the Governor General, remarking "[Canadians] fought courageously and with great ingenuity in winning the strategic high point of Vimy Ridge, though victory came at a heavy cost".

Two postage stamps were released jointly by Canada Post and France's La Poste featuring the memorial, one designed by each country, to commemorate the centennial of the Battle of Vimy Ridge.

== Site ==
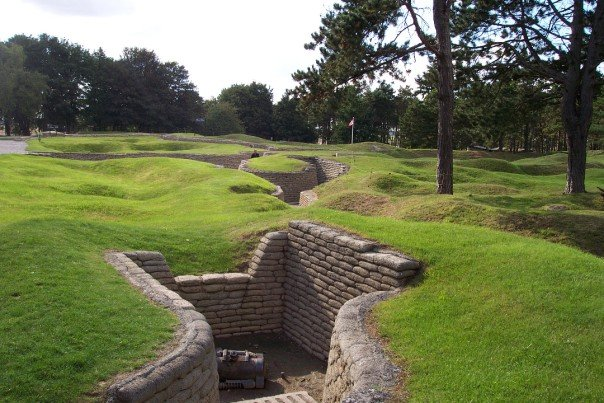
Trenches preserved in concrete

The Canadian National Vimy Memorial site is approximately 8 km (5.0 mi) north of Arras, France, circled by the small towns and communes of Vimy to the east, Givenchy-en-Gohelle to the north, Souchez to the northwest, Neuville-Saint-Vaast to the south and Thélus to the southeast. The site is one of the few places on the former Western Front where a visitor can see the trench lines of a First World War battlefield and the related terrain in a preserved natural state. The total area of the site is 100 hectares (250 acres), much of which is forested and off limits to visitors to ensure public safety. The site's rough terrain and buried unexploded munitions make the task of grass cutting too dangerous for human operators. Instead, sheep graze the open meadows of the site.

The site was established to honour the memory of the Canadian Corps, but it also contains other memorials. These are dedicated to the French Moroccan Division, Lions Club International, and Lieutenant-Colonel Mike Watkins. There are also two Commonwealth War Graves Commission cemeteries on site: Canadian Cemetery No. 2 and Givenchy Road Canadian Cemetery. Beyond being a popular location for battlefield tours, the site is also an important location in the burgeoning field of First World War battlefield archaeology, because of its preserved and largely undisturbed state. The site's interpretive centre helps visitors fully understand the Vimy Memorial, the preserved battlefield park, and the history of the Battle of Vimy within the context of Canada's participation in the First World War. The Canadian National Vimy Memorial and Beaumont-Hamel Newfoundland Memorial sites comprise close to 80 percent of conserved First World War battlefields in existence and between them receive over one million visitors each year.

=== Vimy memorial ===
Allward constructed the memorial on the vantage point of Hill 145, the highest point on the ridge. The memorial contains many stylized features, including 20 human figures, which help the viewer in contemplating the structure as a whole. The front wall, normally mistaken for the rear, is 7.3 metres (24 ft) high and represents an impenetrable wall of defence. There is a group of figures at each end of the front wall, next to the base of the steps. The Breaking of the Sword is at the southern corner of the front wall while Sympathy of the Canadians for the Helpless is at the northern corner. Collectively, the two groups are The Defenders and represent the ideals for which Canadians gave their lives during the war. There is a cannon barrel draped in laurel and olive branches carved into the wall above each group, to symbolize victory and peace. In Breaking of the Sword, three young men are present, one of whom is crouching and breaking his sword. This statue represents the defeat of militarism and the general desire for peace. This grouping of figures is the most overt image to pacifism in the monument, the breaking of a sword being extremely uncommon in war memorials. The original plan for the sculpture included one figure crushing a German helmet with his foot. It was later decided to dismiss this feature because of its overtly militaristic imagery. In Sympathy of the Canadians for the Helpless, one man stands erect while three other figures, stricken by hunger or disease, are crouched and kneeling around him. The standing man represents Canada's sympathy for the weak and oppressed.

The figure of a cloaked young woman stands on top and at the centre of the front wall and overlooks the Douai Plains. She has her head bowed, her eyes cast down, and her chin resting in one hand. Below her at ground level is a sarcophagus, bearing a Brodie helmet and a sword, and draped in laurel branches. The saddened figure of Canada Bereft, also known as Mother Canada, is a national personification of the young nation of Canada, mourning her dead. (Note: Dancer turned model Edna Moynihan served as the model with the statue itself being carved by Italian Luigi Rigamonti.) The statue, a reference to traditional images of the Mater Dolorosa and presented in a similar style to that of Michelangelo's Pietà, faces eastward looking out to the dawn of the new day. Unlike the other statues on the monument, stonemasons carved Canada Bereft from a single 30 tonne block of stone. The statue is the largest single piece in the monument and serves as a focal point. The area in front of the memorial was turned into a grassed space, which Allward referred to as the amphitheatre, that fanned out from the monument's front wall for a distance of 270 feet (82 m) while the battle-damaged landscape around the sides and back of the monument were left untouched.

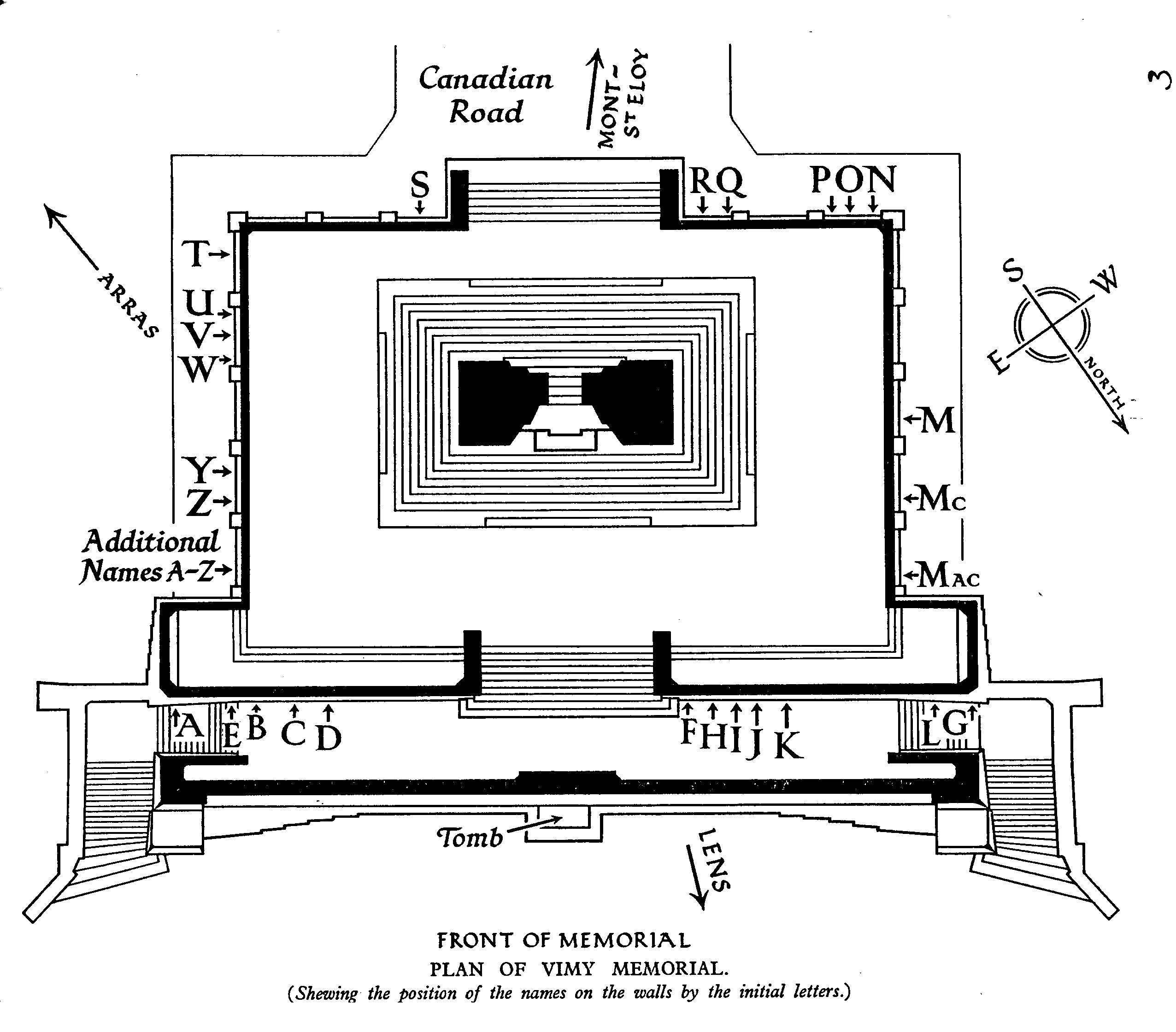
Layout map of the memorial

The twin pylons rise to a height 30 metres above the memorial's stone platform; one bears the maple leaf for Canada and the other the fleur-de-lis for France, and both symbolize the unity and sacrifice of the two countries. At the top of the pylons is a grouping of figures known collectively as the Chorus. The most senior figures represent Justice and Peace; Peace stands with a torch upraised, making it the highest point in the region. The pair is in a style similar to Allward's previously commissioned statues of Truth and Justice, located outside the Supreme Court of Canada in Ottawa. The remainder of the Chorus is located directly below the senior figures: Faith, Hope and Truth on the eastern pylon; and Honour, Charity and Knowledge on the western pylon. Around these figures are shields of Canada, Britain, and France. Large crosses adorn the outside of each pylon. The First World War battle honours of the Canadian regiments, and a dedicatory message to Canada's war dead in both French and English are at the base of the pylons. The Spirit of Sacrifice is at the base between the two pylons. In the display, a young dying soldier is gazing upward in a crucifixion-like pose, having thrown his torch to a comrade who holds it aloft behind him. In a lightly veiled reference to the poem In Flanders Fields by John McCrae, the torch is passed from one comrade to another in an effort to keep alive the memory of the war dead.

The Mourning Parents, one male and one female figure, are reclining on either side of the western steps on the reverse side of the monument. They represent the mourning mothers and fathers of the nation and are likely patterned on the four statues by Michelangelo on the Medici Tomb in Florence. Inscribed on the outside wall of the monument are the names of the 11,285 Canadians killed in France whose final resting place is unknown. Most Commonwealth War Graves Commission memorials present names in a descending list format in a manner that permits the modification of panels as remains are found and identified. Allward instead sought to present the names as a seamless list and decided to do so by inscribing the names in continuous bands, across both vertical and horizontal seams, around the base of the monument. As a consequence, as remains were discovered it was not possible to remove commemorated names without interrupting the seamless list, and as a consequence there are individuals who have a known grave but are commemorated on the memorial. The memorial contains the names of four posthumous Victoria Cross recipients; Robert Grierson Combe, Frederick Hobson, William Johnstone Milne, and Robert Spall.

=== Moroccan Division Memorial ===
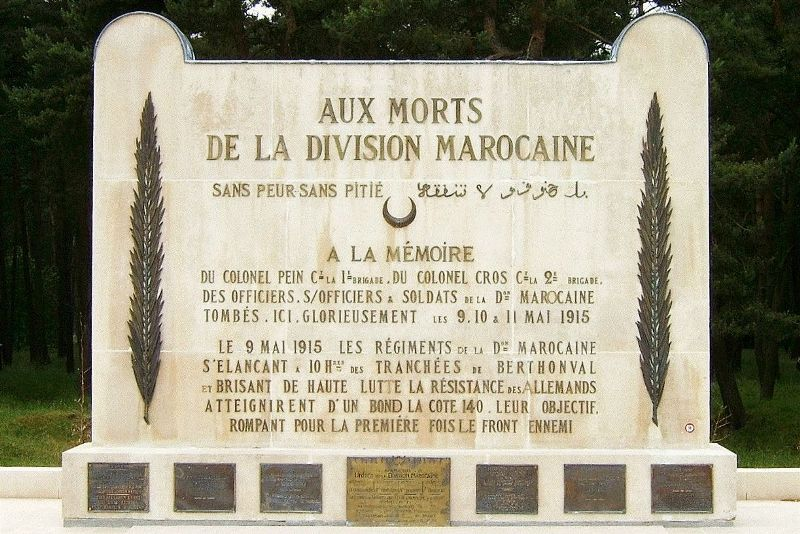
The Moroccan Division Memorial

The Moroccan Division Memorial is dedicated to the memory of the French and Foreign members of the Moroccan Division, killed during the Second Battle of Artois in May 1915. The monument was raised by veterans of the division and inaugurated on 14 June 1925, having been built without planning permission. Excluding the various commemorative plaques at the bottom front facade of the memorial, campaign battles are inscribed on the left- and right-hand side corner view of the memorial. The veterans of the division later funded the April 1987 installation of a marble plaque that identified the Moroccan Division as the only division where all subordinate units had been awarded the Legion of Honour.

The Moroccan Division was initially raised as the Marching Division of Morocco. The division comprised units of varying origins and although the name would indicate otherwise, it did not in fact contain any units originating from Morocco. Moroccans were part of the Marching Regiment of the Foreign Legion which was formed from the merger of the 2nd Marching Regiment of the 1st Foreign Regiment with the 2nd Marching Regiment of the 2nd Foreign Regiment, both also part of the Moroccan Division Brigades. The division contained Tirailleurs and Zouaves, of principally Tunisian and Algerian origin, and most notably Legionnaires from the 2nd Marching Regiment of the 1st Foreign Regiment and the 7th Algerian Tirailleurs Regiment. The French Legionnaires came, as attested to by a plaque installed on the memorial, from 52 different countries and included amongst them American, Polish, Russian, Italian, Greek, German, Czechoslovak, Swedish, Armenian, various nationals of the Jewish faith (http://monumentsmorts.univ-lille3.fr/monument/2892/givenchyengohelle-autre/), and Swiss volunteers such as writer Blaise Cendrars.

In the battle, General Victor d'Urbal, commander of the French Tenth Army, sought to dislodge the Germans from the region by attacking their positions at Vimy Ridge and Notre Dame de Lorette. When the attack began on 9 May 1915, the French XXXIII Army Corps made significant territorial gains. The Moroccan Division, which was part of the XXXIII Army Corps, quickly moved through the German defences and advanced 4 kilometres (4,400 yd) into German lines in two hours. The division managed to capture the height of the ridge, with small parties even reaching the far side of the ridge, before retreating due to a lack of reinforcements. Even after German counter-attacks, the division managed to hold a territorial gain of 2,100 m (6,900 ft). The division did however suffer heavy casualties. Those killed in the battle and commemorated on the memorial include both of the division's brigade commanders, Colonels Gaston Cros and Louis Augustus Theodore Pein.

=== Grange Subway ===
The First World War's Western Front included an extensive system of tunnels, subways, and dugouts. The Grange Subway is a tunnel system that is approximately 800 metres (870 yd) in length and once connected the reserve lines to the front line. This permitted soldiers to advance to the front quickly, securely, and unseen. A portion of this tunnel system is open to the public through regular guided tours provided by Canadian student guides.

The Arras-Vimy sector was conducive to tunnel excavation owing to the soft, porous yet extremely stable nature of the chalk underground. As a result, pronounced underground warfare had been a feature of the Vimy sector since 1915. In preparation for the Battle of Vimy Ridge, five British tunnelling companies excavated 12 subways along the Canadian Corps' front, the longest of which was 1.2 kilometres (1,300 yd) in length. The tunnellers excavated the subways at a depth of 10 metres to ensure protection from large calibre howitzer shellfire. The subways were often dug at a pace of four metres a day and were often two metres tall and one metre wide. This underground network often incorporated or included concealed light rail lines, hospitals, command posts, water reservoirs, ammunition stores, mortar and machine gun posts, and communication centres.

=== Lieutenant-Colonel Mike Watkins memorial ===
Near the Canadian side of the restored trenches is a small memorial plaque dedicated to Lieutenant-Colonel Mike Watkins MBE. Watkins was head of Explosive Ordnance Disposal at the Directorate of Land Service Ammunition, Royal Logistic Corps, and a leading British explosive ordnance disposal expert. In August 1998, he died in a roof collapse near a tunnel entrance while undertaking a detailed investigative survey of the British tunnel system on the grounds of the Canadian National Vimy Memorial site. Watkins was no stranger to the tunnel system at Vimy Ridge. Earlier the same year, he participated in the successful disarming of 3 tonnes of deteriorated ammonal explosives located under a road intersection on the site.

=== Visitors' centre ===
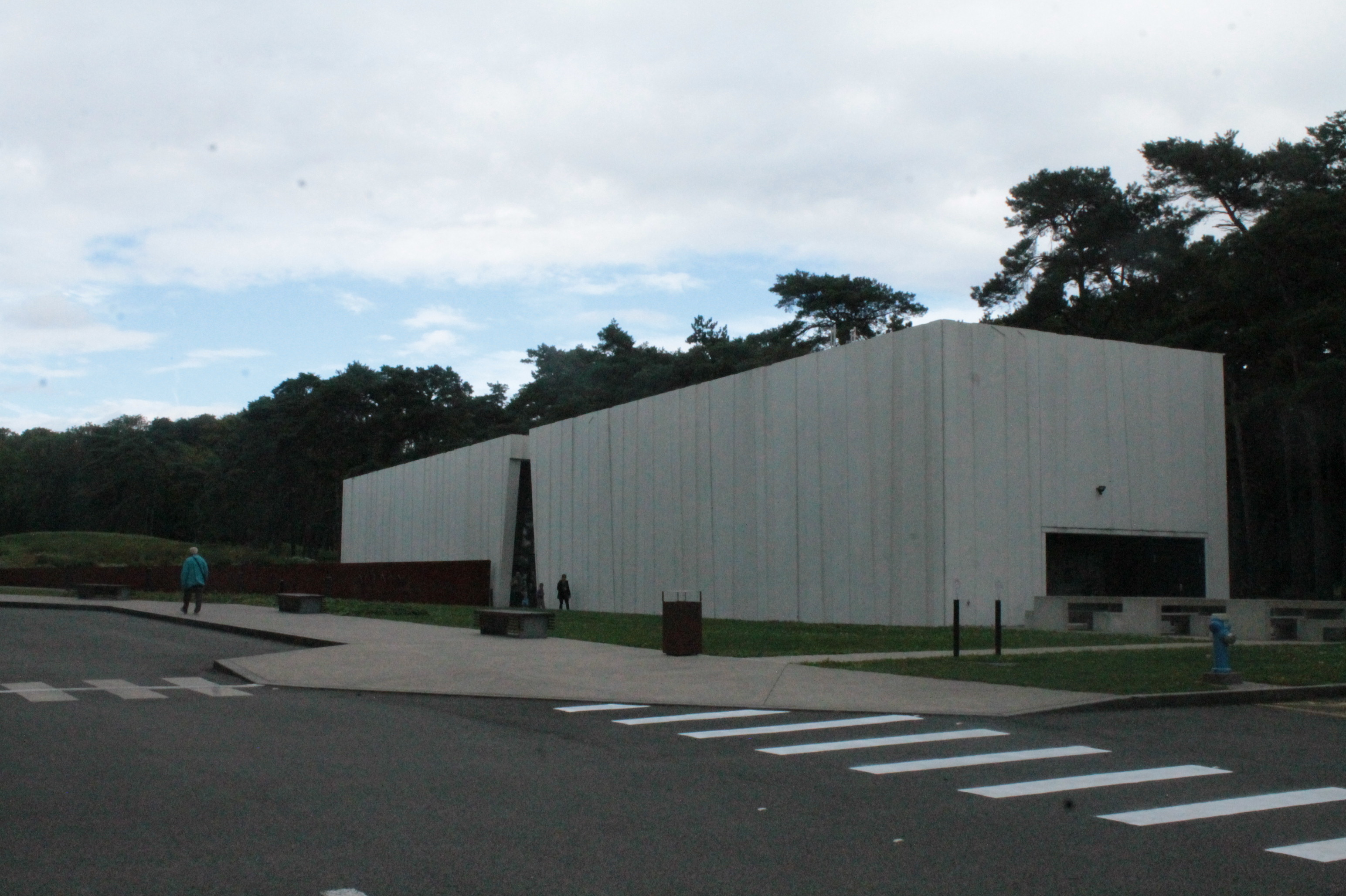
Vimy Ridge Visitor Centre

The site has a visitors' centre, staffed by Canadian student guides, which is open seven days a week. During the memorial restoration, the original visitors' centre near the monument was closed and replaced with a temporary one, which remains in use today. The visitors' centre is now near the preserved forward trench lines, close to many of the craters created by underground mining during the war and near the entrance of the Grange Subway. Construction of a new educational visitors' centre is expected to be completed by April 2017, in advance of the 100th anniversary of the battle. The new CA$10 million visitor centre is a public-private partnership between government and the Vimy Foundation. In order to raise funds the Vimy Foundation granted naming rights in various halls of the visitor centre to sponsors, an approach which has met some level of controversy due to the site being a memorial park.

== Sociocultural influence ==
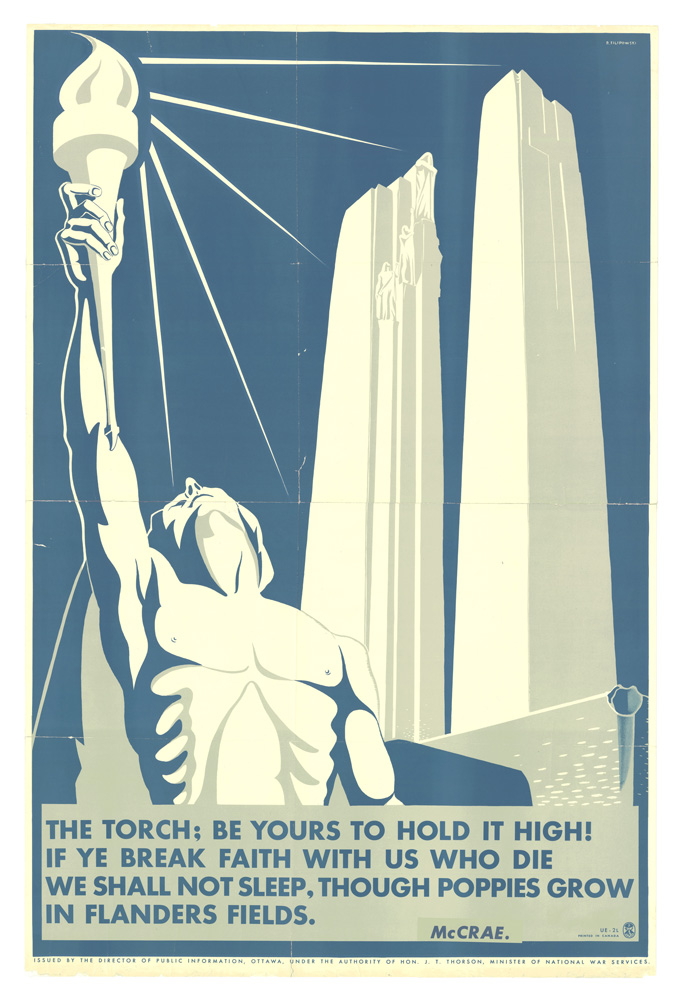
The Vimy Memorial displayed in a Canadian World War II recruitment poster

The Canadian National Vimy Memorial site has considerable sociocultural significance for Canada. The idea that Canada's national identity and nationhood were born out of the Battle of Vimy Ridge is an opinion that is widely repeated in military and general histories of Canada. Historian Denise Thomson suggests that the construction of the Vimy memorial represents the culmination of an increasingly assertive nationalism that developed in Canada during the interwar period. Hucker suggests that the memorial transcends the Battle of Vimy Ridge and now serves as an enduring image of the First World War as a whole, while expressing the enormous impact of war in general, and also considers that the 2005 restoration project serves as evidence of a new generation's determination to remember Canada's contribution and sacrifice during the First World War.

The Historic Sites and Monuments Board of Canada recognized the importance of the site by recommending its designation as one of the National Historic Sites of Canada; it was so designated in 1996, and is one of only two outside of Canada. The other is the Beaumont-Hamel Newfoundland Memorial, also in France. Remembrance has also taken other forms: the Vimy Foundation, having been established to preserve and promote Canada's First World War legacy as symbolized by the victory at the Battle of Vimy Ridge, and Vimy Ridge Day, to commemorate the deaths and casualties during the battle. Local Vimy resident Georges Devloo spent 13 years until his death in 2009 offering car rides to Canadian tourists to and from the memorial at no charge, as a way of paying tribute to the Canadians who fought at Vimy.

The memorial is not without its critics. Alana Vincent has argued that constituent parts of the monument are in conflict, and as a result the message conveyed by the monument is not unified. Visually, Vincent argues there is a dichotomy between the triumphant pose of the figures at the top of the pylons and the mourning posture of those figures at the base. Textually, she argues the inscription text celebrating the victory at the Battle of Vimy Ridge strikes a very different tone to the list of names of the missing at the base of the monument.

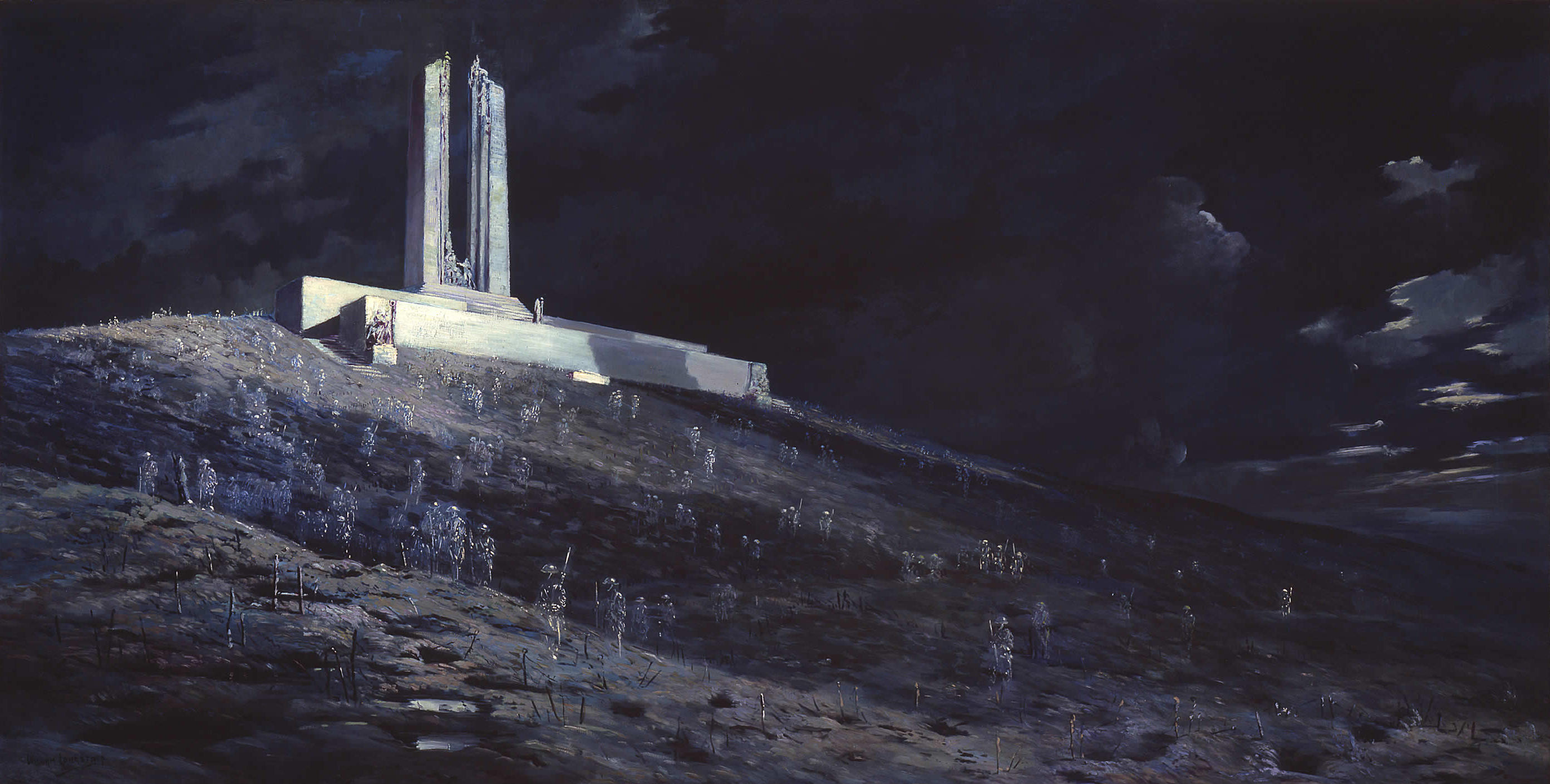
Ghosts of Vimy Ridge by Will Longstaff

The memorial is regularly the subject or inspiration of other artistic projects. In 1931, Will Longstaff painted Ghosts of Vimy Ridge, depicting ghosts of men from the Canadian Corps on Vimy Ridge surrounding the memorial, though the memorial was still several years away from completion. The memorial has been the subject of stamps in both France and Canada, including a French series in 1936 and a Canadian series on the 50th anniversary of the Armistice of 11 November 1918. The Canadian Unknown Soldier was selected from a cemetery in the vicinity of the Canadian National Vimy Memorial, and the design of the Canadian Tomb of the Unknown Soldier is based upon the stone sarcophagus at the base of the Vimy memorial. The Never Forgotten National Memorial was intended to be a 24-metre (79 ft) statue inspired by the Canada Bereft statue on the memorial, before the project was cancelled in February 2016.

A 2001 Canadian historical novel The Stone Carvers by Jane Urquhart involves the characters in the design and creation of the memorial. In 2007, the memorial was a short-listed selection for the Seven Wonders of Canada. The Royal Canadian Mint released commemorative coins featuring the memorial on several occasions, including a 5 cent sterling silver coin in 2002 and a 30 dollar sterling silver coin in 2007. The Sacrifice Medal, a Canadian military decoration created in 2008, features the image of Mother Canada on the reverse side of the medal. A permanent bas relief sculpted image of the memorial is presented in the gallery of the grand hall of the Embassy of France in Canada to symbolize the close relations between the two countries. The memorial is featured on the reverse of the Frontier Series Canadian polymer $20 banknote, which was released by the Bank of Canada on 7 November 2012.

== See also ==
- World War I memorials
- Twin Towers
