= Canadian Battlefields Memorials Commission =

Former government body (1920–1921)

The Canadian Battlefields Memorials Commission was a special commission established by the House of Commons of Canada, on the recommendations of the British Battle Exploits Memorials Committee. The Canadian House of Commons established the committee in September 1920 with the mandate of selecting and establishing First World War memorial sites in France and Belgium.

== History ==
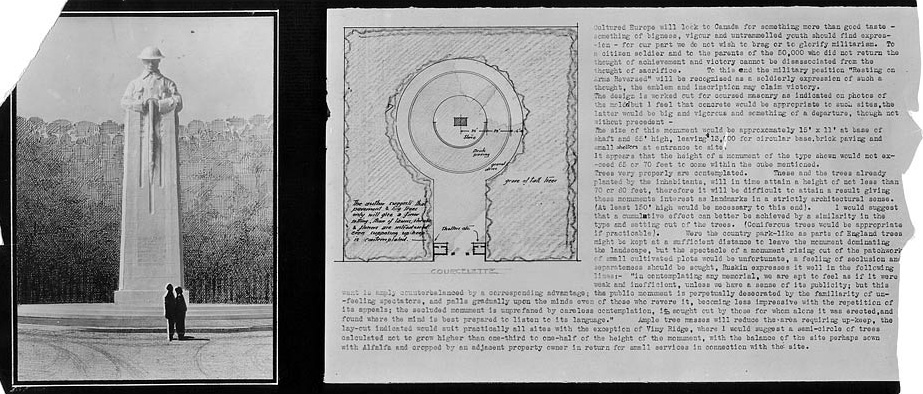
The design submitted of Frederick Clemesha.

In February 1919, the Battle Exploits Memorials Committee, a Special Committee of the House of Commons, was formed in the United Kingdom with the mandate of identifying the principal battle sites and allocating sites to appropriate countries. The Canadian representative to the committee, Brigadier General Garnet Hughes, applied for eight memorial sites based upon the recommendation of a collection of Canadian military officers, presided over by Canadian Corps commander Lieutenant General Arthur Currie. In April 1920, the Battle Exploits Memorials Committee announced that it had been awarded eight sites—five in France and three in Belgium—on which to erect memorials. The committee recommended that memorials be erected at "Vimy, Bourlon Wood, Le Quesnel, Dury and Courcelette in France and St. Julien, Hill 62 (Sanctuary Wood), and Passchendaele in Belgium." The Battle Exploits Memorials Committee also recommended that Canada hold an architectural design competition, open to all Canadian architects, designers, sculptors and other artists, to determine the design or designs to be adopted. The committee also suggested that a temporary honorary commission be established to hold the design competition, select the designs and undertake the contractual work.

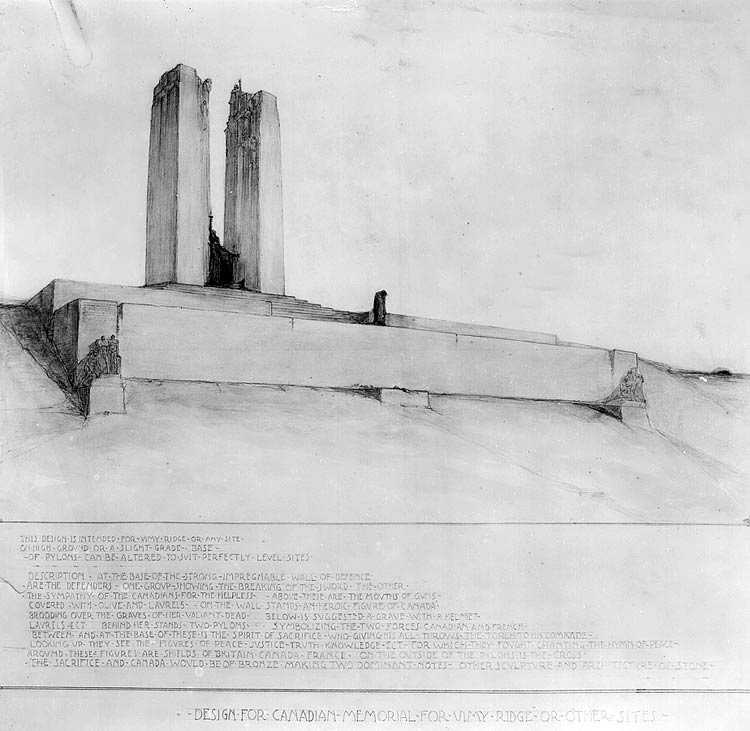
The winning design, submitted by Walter Allward

In September 1920, the Canadian government formed the Canadian Battlefields Memorials Commission to discuss the process and conditions for holding a memorial competition for the sites in Europe, as suggested by the Battle Exploits Memorials Committee. The commission held its first meeting on 26 November 1920 and during this meeting reaffirmed the principle of a design competition open to all Canadian architects, designers, sculptors and artists. Interested parties submitted 160 design drawings and the jury selected 17 submissions for consideration, commissioning each finalist to produce a plaster maquette of their respective design. In October 1921, the commission selected the submission of Toronto sculptor and designer Walter Seymour Allward as the winner of the competition, and that of Frederick Chapman Clemesha as runner-up. The complexity of Allward's design precluded the possibility of duplicating the design at each site.

The commission revised its initial plans and decided to build two distinctive memorials—that of Allward and Clemesha—and six smaller identical memorials. At the outset, members of the commission debated where to build Allward's winning design. Former Canadian Corps commander, Lieutenant-General Arthur Currie appeared before the committee and argued in favour of the government placing the monument in Belgium on Hill 62. In the end, the commission selected Vimy Ridge as the preferred site, largely because of its elevation above the plain below. In the interval between the 1st and 2nd session of the 14th Canadian Parliament, Speaker of the House of Commons of Canada and Canadian Battlefields Memorials Commission committee member Rodolphe Lemieux went to France to negotiate the acquisition of land on Vimy Ridge. In December 1922, Lemieux concluded an agreement with France in which France granted Canada "freely and for all time" the use of 250 acres (100 ha) of land on Vimy Ridge, in recognition of Canada's war effort. The only condition placed on the donation was that Canada use the land to erect a monument commemorating Canadian soldiers killed during the First World War and assume the responsibility for the maintenance of the memorial and the surrounding battlefield park.

== Members ==
Name	Position
Major General Sydney Chilton Mewburn	Chairman
Colonel Henry Campbell Osborne	Honorary Secretary
Rodolphe Lemieux	General member
Lieutenant General Richard Turner	General member
John Gillanders Turriff	General member
Lieutenant Colonel Reuben Wells Leonard	General member
Percy Erskine Nobbs	Architectural Adviser
