= Courcelette =

- Commune
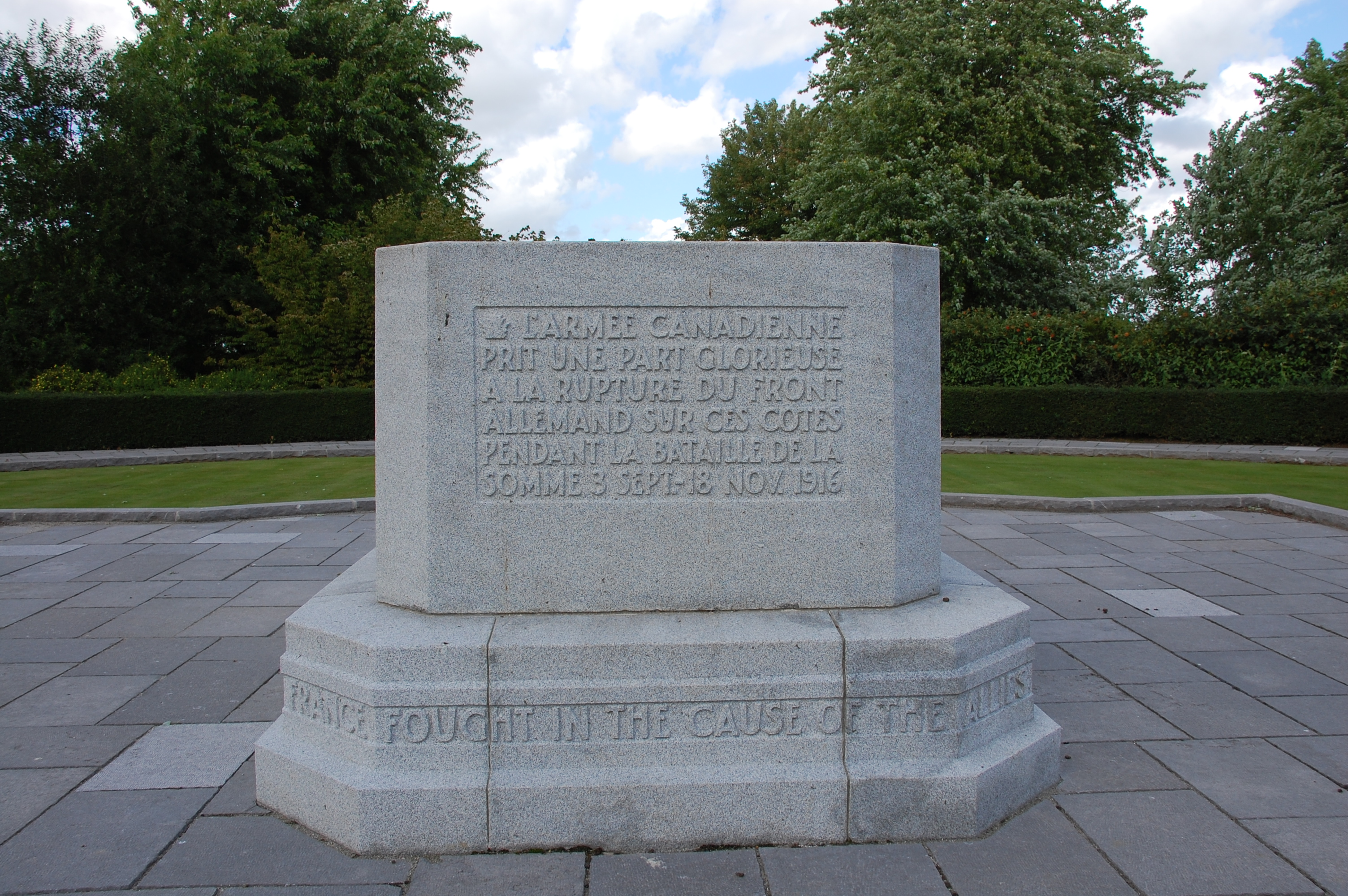
- Courcelette Memorial
- Location of Courcelette
- Location within France Location within Hauts-de-France
- Coordinates: 50°03′32″N 2°44′52″E
- Country: France
- Region: Hauts-de-France
- Department: Somme
- Arrondissement: Péronne
- Canton: Albert
- Intercommunality: Pays du Coquelicot

Government
  - Mayor (2020–2026): Michel Dacheux
- Area^{1}: 4.66 km^{2} (1.80 sq mi)
- Elevation: 150 m (490 ft)
- Highest elevation: 156 m (512 ft)
- Lowest elevation: 109 m (358 ft)
- Population (2023): 152
  - Density: 32.6/km^{2} (84.5/sq mi)
- Time zone: UTC+01:00 (CET)
  - Summer (DST): UTC+02:00 (CEST)
- INSEE/Postal code: 80216 /80300
- ^{1} French Land Register data, which excludes lakes, ponds, glaciers > 1 km^{2} (0.386 sq mi or 247 acres) and river estuaries.

Courcelette (French pronunciation: [kuʁsəlɛt]) is a commune in the Somme department in Hauts-de-France in northern France.

== Geography ==
Courcelette is situated on the D929 and D107 crossroads, some 30 miles (48 km) northeast of Amiens.

== History ==
Courcelette was a major tactical objective in the Battle of Flers-Courcelette during the Somme Offensive of the First World War during which the village was razed. The village was assigned as the major objective of the Canadian Corps during that battle and they succeeded in capturing it. Accordingly, the actions and sacrifices of the Canadians are commemorated at the Courcelette Memorial which is just south of the village beside the D929 roadway.

== Population ==
Historical population
Year	Pop.	±% p.a.
1968	180	—
1975	176	−0.32%
1982	150	−2.26%
1990	142	−0.68%
1999	133	−0.72%
2007	142	+0.82%
2012	146	+0.56%
2017	154	+1.07%
2023	152	−0.22%
Source: INSEE

== See also ==
- Battle of Flers-Courcelette
- Communes of the Somme department
