= Never Forgotten National Memorial =

Coordinates: 46.750612°N 60.323846°W

The Mother Canada monument, officially the Never Forgotten National Memorial, was a war memorial planned to be built in Cape Breton Highlands National Park, Cape Breton Island, Nova Scotia. A memorial to Canadian Armed Forces overseas casualties, especially those of World War I, it was intended as a transatlantic complement to the Canadian National Vimy Memorial in France. After considerable controversy surrounding its location, the project was cancelled in 2016.

== Overview ==
The monument was conceived of by Toronto businessman Tony Trigiani, who had the idea while visiting the Moro River Canadian War Cemetery in Italy. It is modelled on the Canada Bereft figure at the Canadian National Vimy Memorial in France.

The $25 million project was to include a 24-metre statue of a bereft mother, her hands outstretched towards Europe and the Canada Bereft monument at the Vimy Memorial.

The monument site would have included an interpretive centre, a restaurant, and a souvenir shop, among other amenities. It was to be funded through donations collected by the Never Forgotten National Memorial Foundation, headed by Toronto businessman Tony Patrick Trigiani. The project had been conceived by Trigiani after he visited a Canadian World War I cemetery in Europe.

== Controversy ==
Opinions on the monument were divided. Supporting petitions from New Waterford, Dominion, Glace Bay, Iona, Sydney, Ingonish, and Hants County, as well as Grand Prairie, Alberta and Central Ontario, were presented to Parliament by MP Mark Eyking on January 28, 2016.

Significant controversy focused on the monument's location, Green Cove, a pink granite formation along the Cabot Trail. Cape Breton locals protested the planned location, arguing constructing the memorial at Green Cove would destroy the natural landscape and hinder public access to the sea along the trail. They also argued that the decision to build a war memorial at Green Cove did not make sense, as the area lacks military significance. The Globe and Mail criticized the monument, calling it "hubristic, ugly and just plain wrong". Another editorial opposed it saying “the bigger-is-better approach to art is best left to Stalinist tyrants, theme-park entrepreneurs and insecure municipalities hoping to waylay bored drive-by tourists.”

Major-General Lewis MacKenzie defended the proposed location, arguing that the Cape Breton Highlands was one of the last sightings of Canada soldiers saw as they left for deployment, justifying the monument's location along the coast of Cape Breton. Lt. Col. Ferguson Mobbs of the Bradford Branch of the Royal Canadian Legion in Ontario also defended the monument, commenting that its location at the Green Cove was "what was the easternmost point of Canada in 1914, before Newfoundland joined confederation, in a direct line with Vimy Ridge".

The project was approved by the Conservative Government of Canada, which donated $100,000 to the memorial foundation. Following the Liberal victory in the 2015 election, the monument was placed under review by Parks Canada and eventually canceled in February 2016. According to a Parks Canada spokesperson, the agency's review "concluded too many key elements remained outstanding, including the availability of funds to the Foundation, agreement on the structuring of the funding for construction and maintenance, and a definitive final design plan."

In 2024, Trigiani sued Parks Canada for breach of contract and acting "in bad faith", asking the court to order Parks Canada to proceed with building the memorial, or pay $6 million in damages. The statute of limitations in Ontario requires lawsuits to be filed within two years. The lawsuit claims that the limitation period doesn't apply because the proceedings are "based on existing aboriginal and treaty rights of the aboriginal peoples of Canada."
