= Richard Basil Brandram Jones =

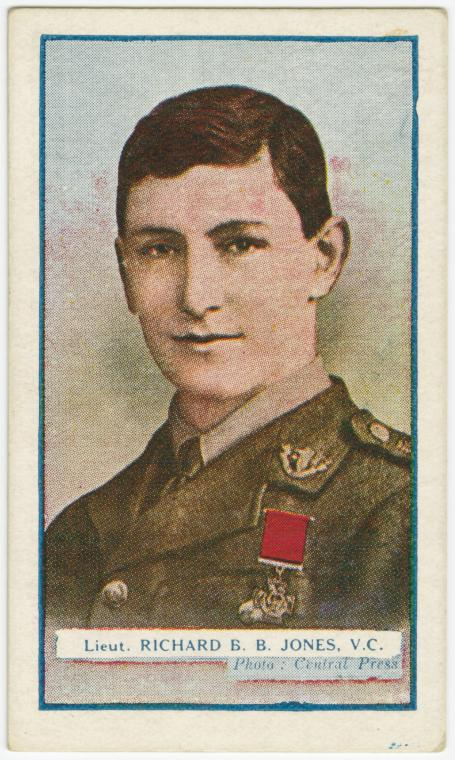
- Born: 30 April 1897; South East London, England
- Died: 21 May 1916 (aged 19); Vimy, France
- Burial place: Remembered on the Arras Memorial
- Military career
- Allegiance: United Kingdom
- Branch: British Army
- Service years: 1914–1916
- Rank: Lieutenant
- Units: Loyal North Lancashire Regiment
- Conflicts: World War I: Western Front †
- Awards: Victoria Cross

Richard Basil Brandram Jones VC (30 April 1897 – 21 May 1916) was an English recipient of the Victoria Cross, the highest and most prestigious award for gallantry in the face of the enemy that can be awarded to British and Commonwealth forces.

Jones was born on 30 April 1897 in London to Henry Thomas Brandram Jones and Caroline Emma Jones, he was educated at Dulwich College between 1909 and 1914.

He was 19 years old, and a Temporary Lieutenant in the 8th Battalion, The Loyal North Lancashire Regiment, British Army during the First World War when the following deed took place on 21 May 1916 at the Broadmarsh Crater, Vimy, France for which he was awarded the Victoria Cross.

== Citation ==
For most conspicuous bravery. He was holding with his platoon a crater recently captured from the enemy. About 7.30 P.M. the enemy exploded a mine forty yards to his right, and at the same time put a heavy barrage of fire on our trenches, thus isolating the Platoon. They then attacked in overwhelming numbers. Lt. Jones kept his men together, steadying them by his fine example, and shot no less than fifteen of the enemy as they advanced, counting them aloud as he did so to cheer his men. When his ammunition was expended he took a bomb, but was shot through the head while getting up to throw it. His splendid courage had so encouraged his men that when they had no more ammunition or bombs they threw stones and ammunition boxes at the enemy till only nine of the platoon were left. Finally they were compelled to retire.

— The London Gazette, 5 August 1916

His Victoria Cross is held at his old school, Dulwich College. The Howard-Jones Challenge Cup for shooting was established in memory of C. C. Howard, killed with the "Loyals" at Vimy Ridge in May 1916 and Richard Jones.

== Bibliography ==
- Gliddon, Gerald (2004) [2012]. VCs of the First World War: Cambrai 1917. The History Press. ISBN 978-0-75-247668-1.
- Ingleton, Roy (2011). Kent VCs. Pen and Sword Books. ISBN 978-1848844094.
