= Dury Memorial =

World War I memorial

- Canada
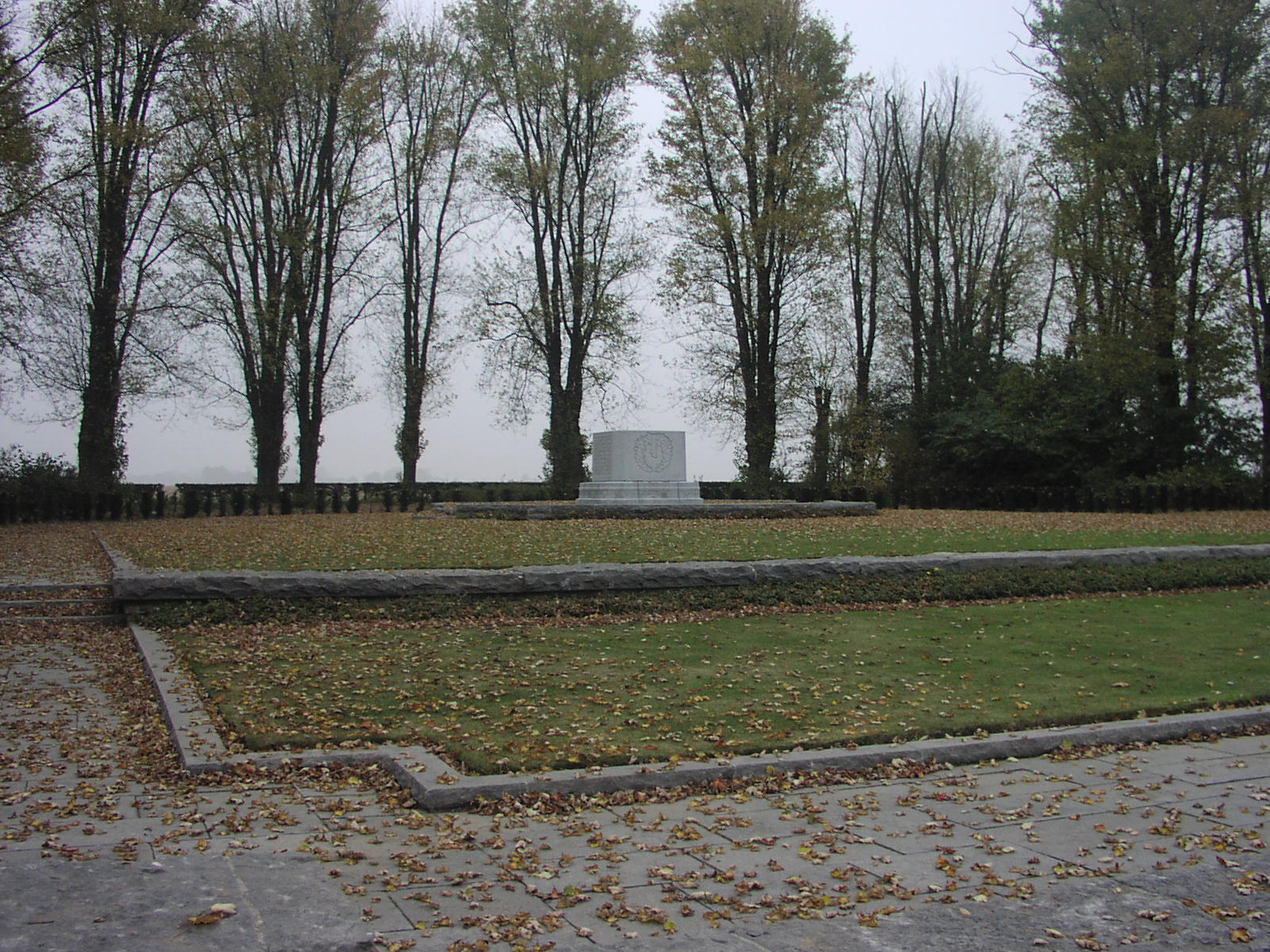
- Canadian Dury Memorial
- For the Canadian Corps' actions in the First World War during the Second Battle of Arras including the Battle of the Scarpe and the breakthrough of the Drocourt–Quéant Line defences of the Hindenburg Line.
- Location: 50°14′3″N 2°59′49″E near Dury, Pas-de-Calais, France
- The inscription reads: "The Canadian Corps 100,000 strong, attacked at Arras on August 26th 1918, stormed successive German lines and here on Sept. 2nd broke and turned the main German position on the Western Front and reached the Canal du Nord"

The Dury Memorial is a World War I Canadian war memorial that commemorates the actions of the Canadian Corps in the Second Battle of Arras, particularly their breakthrough at the Drocourt–Quéant Line switch of the Hindenburg Line just south of the town of Dury, Pas-de-Calais, France.

== Historical background ==
The events commemorated with the Dury Canadian Memorial took place in late August and early September 1918 during a period known as the Hundred Days Offensive or Canada's Hundred Days.

Following close on the heels of their breakthrough success at the Battle of Amiens in August 1918, Allied Command sought to press the advantage created with the Amiens Offensive and penetrate a new axis of attack. The Canadians were withdrawn and redeployed with the British 1st Army 60 kilometres to the north on the eastern fringes of the city of Arras to again take on the role of the spearhead of the attack, as they had at Amiens. The offensive, which became known to the Canadians as the Battle of the Scarpe (1918) or the Second Battle of Arras, was part of the larger Allied Second Battle of the Somme. On 26 August, the attack was launched with the Canadians in the centre of the attack front, moving eastward along the axis of the Arras-Cambrai Road. The corps' 2nd and 3rd Divisions, along with a British division, advanced rapidly from the eastern outskirts of Arras through a series of well-networked trenches and redoubts, pushing 14 kilometres in 4 days, capturing numerous villages as well as 3,300 prisoners and a large number of artillery pieces. During this phase of the fighting, two Canadians, Charles Smith Rutherford and William Clark-Kennedy would earn the Victoria Cross for their actions.

However, the progress was stunted by corps' arrival at the Drocourt–Quéant Line. Otherwise known as the 'DQ Line', this bulwark was part of the Hindenburg Line fortifications which in late 1918, constituted the German Army's last significant organized defensive network in northern France. Built ascending up the forward slope of a hill called Mont Dury and composed of mutually-supporting machine gun and artillery emplacements with bunkers and trenches built of concrete as well as belts of barbed wire up to 100 metres thick, it was arguably the best-engineered series of defences the Canadians had faced at any point in the war. Following a two-day rest, regrouping, and planning period, the Canadian/British assault on the DQ line began on 2 September.

The Battle of Drocourt-Quéant Line began with a concentrated artillery barrage, aircraft strafing the enemy and tanks leading the way, dragging hooks to pull back the barbed wire, clearing paths for the infantry of the 1st and 4th Divisions to storm forward. By the end of the day on the 2nd, the foremost echelons of attackers had fully advanced through the defences and overnight the German defenders largely abandoned their remaining positions. Over the following three days the Canadians advanced almost unharried 6 kilometres to the Canal du Nord, which the enemy had withdrawn behind. At the DQ Line the Canadians inflicted heavy casualties on the defenders and another 6,000 unwounded prisoners were captured at this time. Particularly noteworthy for such a brief battle was that seven Canadians earned a Victoria Cross on 2 September alone.

The brief campaign, lasting from 26 August to 4 September, took a bitter toll on the Canadians as well, with the corps suffering 11,000 casualties in the fighting.

== Monument ==
=== Site selection ===
At the end of the war, The Imperial War Graves Commission granted Canada eight sites – five in France and three in Belgium – on which to erect memorials. Each site represented a significant Canadian engagement in the war and for this reason it was originally decided that each battlefield would be treated equally and graced with identical monuments. The Canadian Battlefields Memorials Commission was formed in November 1920 and decided a competition would be held to select the design of the memorial that would be used at the eight European sites. In October 1922, the submission of Toronto sculptor and designer Walter Seymour Allward was selected as the winner of the competition, and the submission of Frederick Chapman Clemesha placed second. The commission decided Allward's monumental design would be used at Vimy Ridge in France as it was the most dramatic location. Despite a consideration that Alward's monument at Vimy could stand alone as the sole monument to the Canadian efforts in Europe Clemesha's 'Brooding Soldier' design was selected for the remaining seven sites but was later, for a number of reasons, erected only at the Saint Julien Memorial in Belgium.

The remaining six memorials, to be built on sites at Hill 62 and Passchendaele in Belgium and at Bourlon Wood, Courcelette, Dury and Le Quesnel in France would each received a modest memorial designed under the supervision of architect and advisor to the Battlefield Memorials Commission, Percy Erskine Nobbs. Situated on key points of the battlefield they memorialize, the central feature of the memorials would be a 13-tonne cube-shaped block of white-grey granite quarried near Stanstead, Quebec. The blocks are essentially identical, carved with wreathes on two opposing sides and inscribed with the phrase "Honour to the Canadians who on the fields of Flanders and France fought in the cause of the Allies with sacrifice and devotion" around the base. Though uniform in design, they are differentiated in the brief English and French descriptions of the battle they commemorate inscribed on their sides and the small parks that surround the memorial blocks, which vary in shape and layout.

At Dury, the memorial is situated symbolically where the Drocourt–Quéant Line crossed the Arras–Cambrai road. Breaking through at this point gave an expedited approach to the city of Cambrai, which fell just over a month later.

=== Location and design ===
The Canadian Dury Memorial site is south of the village of Dury, on the north side of the D939 Route Nationale, roughly halfway between the cities of Arras and Cambrai.

The site is a modest square park (about 60 metres wide and deep) with tall, stately maple trees and a low hedge on the three sides away from the road surrounding well-kept lawns and the low circular flagstone terrace that the granite memorial block rests on in the centre of the park. The inscription on the memorial block at Dury reads:

The Canadian Corps 100,000 strong attacked at Arras on August 26th 1918, stormed successive German lines and here on Sept. 2nd broke and turned the main German position on the Western Front and reached the Canal du Nord
