= Passchendaele Canadian Memorial =

Canadian war memorial in Belgium

- Canada
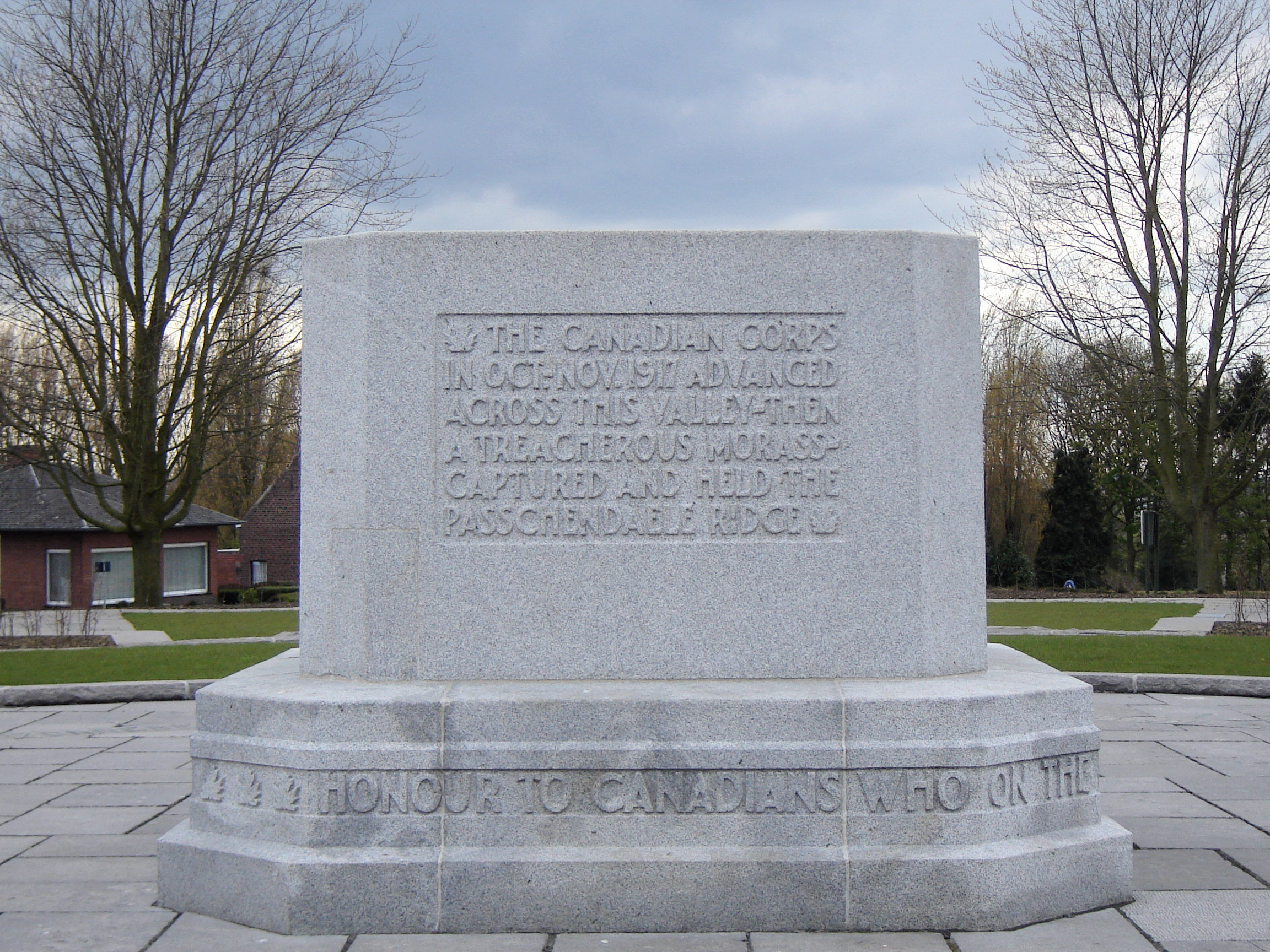
- The Passchendaele Canadian Memorial
- For the Canadian Corps actions in the First World War during the Second Battle of Passchendaele in their taking and holding of Passchendaele village.
- Location: 50°53′52″N 3°0′48″E near Passendale, Belgium on the site of the Crest Farm
- The Canadian Corps in Oct.–Nov. 1917 advanced across this valley – then a treacherous morass – captured and held the Passchendaele Ridge

The Passchendaele Canadian Memorial (also known as Crest Farm Canadian Memorial) is a Canadian war memorial that commemorates the actions of the Canadian Corps in the Second Battle of Passchendaele of World War I. The memorial is located on the former site of Crest Farm, an objective captured by the 4th Canadian Division during the assault of 30 October 1917.

== The battle ==
The Second Battle of Passchendaele was the culminating and final attack of the Third Battle of Ypres during World War I. The battle took place in the Ypres Salient area of the Western Front, in and around the Belgian town of Passchendaele, between 26 October 1917 and 10 November 1917. The Canadian Corps was tasked with relieving the exhausted II Anzac Corps, continuing the advance started with the First Battle of Passchendaele and ultimately capturing the town of Passchendaele itself.

In the low ground west of the Passchendaele Ridge three months of constant shelling had blocked the watercourses that normally provided drainage. When rain began falling, the battlefield was transformed into a quagmire of mud making movement extremely difficult. The mud was to become one of the defining features of the battle for soldiers on both sides, and did a great deal to hamper offensive operations.

The Canadian Corps operation was executed in series of three attacks each with limited objectives, delivered at intervals of three or more days. The execution dates of the phases were tentatively given as 26 October, 30 October and 6 November, with a smaller action later executed on 10 November. The attack was successful in capturing the German-held high ground along the Passchendaele-Westrozebeke ridge but the campaign was forced to end just short of Westrozebeke itself. The Second Battle of Passchendaele cost the Canadian Corps 15 654 casualties with over 4 000 dead, in 16 days of fighting. Nine Victoria Crosses, the highest military decoration for valour awarded to British and Commonwealth forces, were awarded to Canadians for actions during the battle.

== Monument ==
=== Selection ===
At the end of the war, The Imperial War Graves Commission granted Canada eight sites - five in France and three in Belgium - on which to erect memorials. Each site represented a significant Canadian engagement in the war and for this reason it was originally decided that each battlefield would be treated equally and graced with identical monuments. The Canadian Battlefields Memorials Commission was formed in November 1920 and decided a competition would be held to select the design of the memorial that would be used at the eight European sites. In October 1922, the submission of Toronto sculptor and designer Walter Seymour Allward was selected as the winner of the competition, and the submission of Frederick Chapman Clemesha placed second. The commission decided Allward's monumental design would be used at Vimy Ridge in France as it was the most dramatic location. Despite a consideration that Alward's monument at Vimy could stand alone as the sole monument to the Canadian efforts in Europe Clemesha's 'Brooding Soldier' design was selected for the remaining seven sites but was later, for a number of reasons, erected only at St. Julien in Belgium.

The remaining six memorials, to be built on sites at Passchendaele and Hill 62 in Belgium and at Le Quesnel, Dury, Courcelette and Bourlon Wood in France would each received a modest memorial designed under the supervision of architect and advisor to the Battlefield Memorials Commission, Percy Erskine Nobbs. Situated on key points of the battlefield they memorialize, the central feature of the memorials would be a 13-tonne cube-shaped block of white-grey granite quarried near Stanstead, Quebec. The blocks are essentially identical, carved with wreathes on two opposing sides and inscribed with the phrase "Honour to the Canadians who on the fields of Flanders and France fought in the cause of the allies with sacrifice and devotion" around the base. Though uniform in design, they are differentiated in the brief English and French descriptions of the battle they commemorate inscribed on their sides and the small parks that surround the memorial blocks, which vary in shape and layout.

=== Location and design ===
The Passchendaele Canadian Memorial sits at the site of the former Crest Farm, which was the location of some of the most stubborn German resistance the Canadians faced at Passchendaele, and indeed, in their Great War experience. In modern terms, it is found on the aptly named Canadalaan on the southwest fringe of Passendale village.

The central granite block memorial sits in a keyhole-shaped park of well-kept lawns and stone pathways about 100 metres long by 60 metres wide and is bordered with maple trees and a hedge of holly along its edges. The memorial block sits on low circular flagstone terrace and is inscribed:

The Canadian Corps in Oct.–Nov. 1917 advanced across this valley – then a treacherous morass – captured and held the Passchendaele ridge

From the memorial one can look northeast, up the Canadalaan to see the rebuilt church at the centre of Passendale village, to the north, the Bellevue Spur (one of the key axes of the Canadian attack), and down a long avenue of trees to the southwest, the rebuilt spires of Ypres.

== See also ==
- List of World War I memorials and cemeteries in Flanders
