= Saint Julien Memorial =

Canadian war memorial and park in Belgium

St. Julien Memorial
- Canada
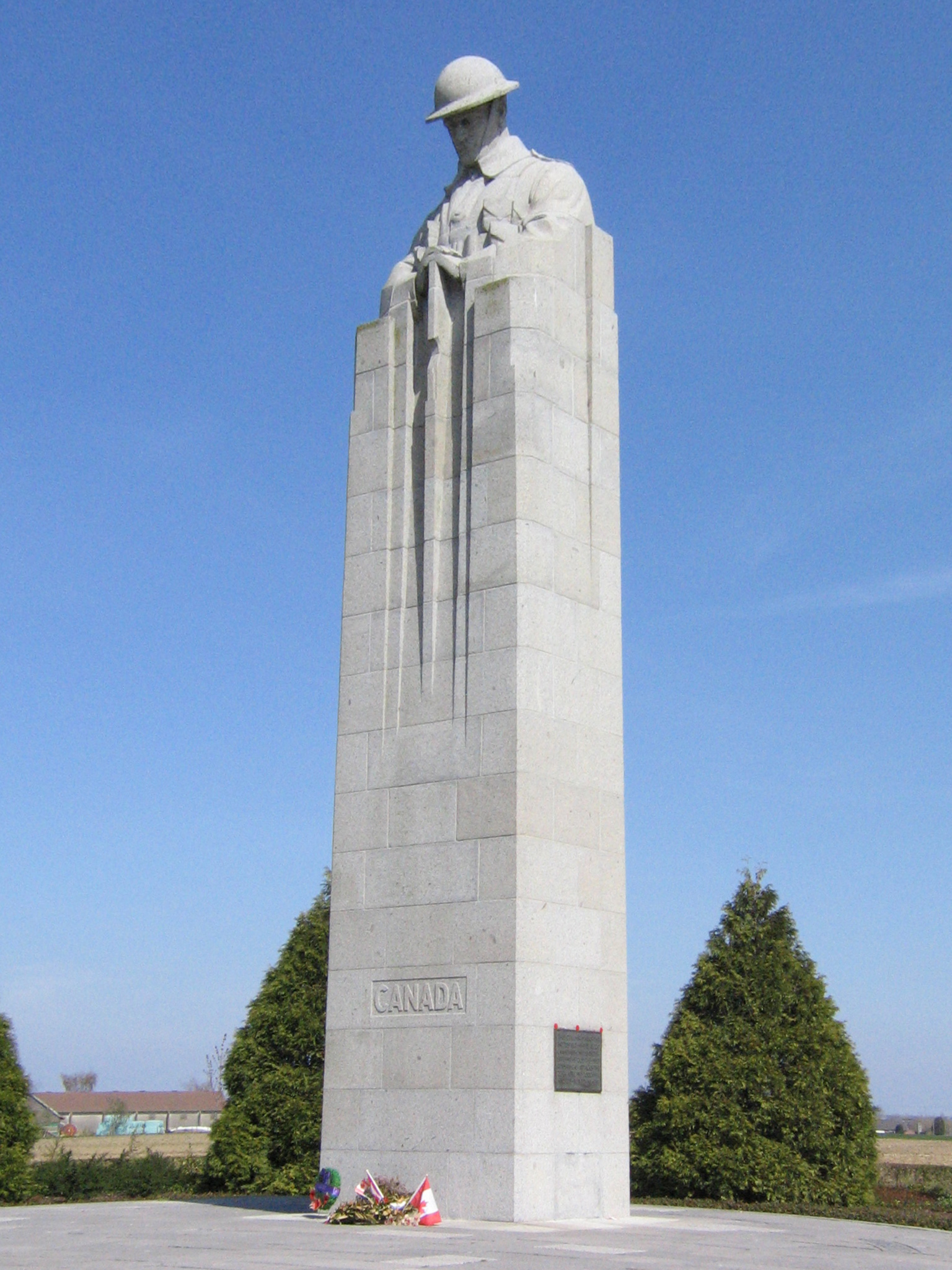
- The Brooding Soldier
- For the Canadian participation in the Second Battle of Ypres between 22 and 24 April 1915.
- Unveiled: 8 July 1923
- Location: 50°53′58″N 2°56′26″E near Saint-Julien, Langemark/Sint-Juliaan, Belgium
- Designed by: Frederick Chapman Clemesha
- The Memorial's plaque reads: THIS COLUMN MARKS THE BATTLEFIELD WHERE 18000 CANADIANS ON THE BRITISH LEFT WITHSTOOD THE FIRST GERMAN GAS ATTACKS THE 22ND-24TH OF APRIL 1915. 2,000 FELL AND LIE BURIED NEARBY

UNESCO World Heritage Site
- Official name: Funerary and memory sites of the First World War (Western Front)
- Type: Cultural
- Criteria: i, ii, vi
- Designated: 2023 (45th session)
- Reference no.: 1567-FL07

The St. Julien Memorial, also known as The Brooding Soldier, is a Canadian war memorial and small commemorative park located in the village of Saint-Julien, Langemark (West Flemish: Sint-Juliaan), Belgium. The memorial commemorates the Canadian First Division's participation in the Second Battle of Ypres of World War I which included fighting in the face of the first poison gas attacks along the Western Front. The memorial was designed by World War I veteran and architect Lieutenant Frederick Chapman Clemesha, and was selected following a design competition organized by the Canadian Battlefields Memorials Commission in 1920.

== Background ==
The village of Saint Julien and a section of forested land called Saint Julien Wood was at a pronounced bend in the north east sector of the Ypres Salient prior to the Second Battle of Ypres. The area was also the junction between the British and French sectors of responsibility. The Canadian First Division was assigned the most northern section of the British line and to their left, the 45th (Algerian) Division held the southernmost end of the French line. The German Army had brought forward 168 tons of chlorine gas deployed in 5,730 cylinders buried in front of their trenches, opposite Langemark-Poelkapelle, north of Ypres. The Canadians, who had been moved into their positions only a few days earlier were manning the lines for several hundred metres along a front to the southwest of St. Julien when the German Army unleashed the first poison gas attack on the Western Front on 22 April 1915.

Pushed towards the Allied lines by a wind from the north, the initial gas attack largely drifted to the north and west of the Canadian lines, into the trenches of the French colonial troops of the French 45th (Algerian) and 87th (Territorial) Divisions, of 26th Reserve Corps. The gas drifted across positions largely held French colonial troops who broke ranks and abandoned their trenches after witnessing the early casualties, creating an 8,000 yard (7 km) gap in the Allied line. The German infantry were also wary of the gas and, lacking reinforcements, failed to exploit the break before the First Canadian Division and assorted French troops reformed the line in scattered, hastily prepared positions 1,000 to 3,000 yards apart. In actions at Kitcheners Wood, Mauser Ridge, Pilkem Ridge and Gravenstafel Ridge the Canadians held the line and prevented a German breakthrough until they were relieved by reinforcements on the 24 April.

In the 48 crucial hours that they held the line, 6,035 Canadians – or one man in every three who went into battle – became casualties; of that number, approximately 2,000 (or one man in every nine) were killed.

== Memorial ==
=== Site and design selection ===
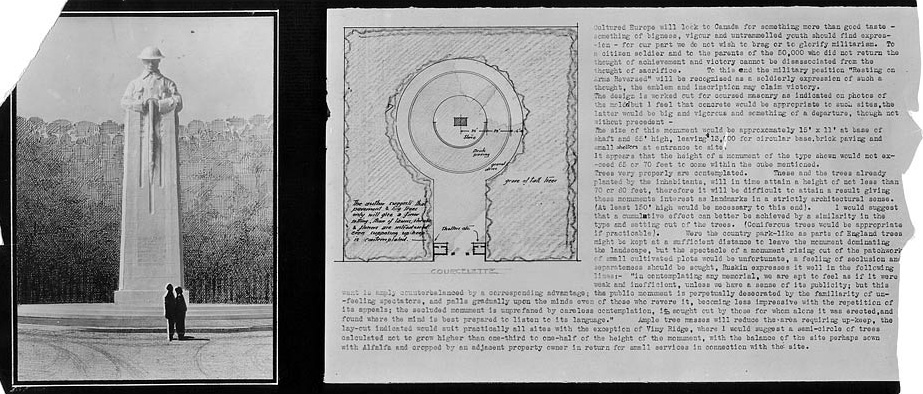
Clemesha's design proposal

At the end of the war, The Imperial War Graves Commission granted Canada eight sites – five in France and three in Belgium – on which to erect memorials. Each site represented a significant Canadian engagement in the war and for this reason it was originally decided that each battlefield would be treated equally and graced with identical monuments. The Canadian Battlefields Memorials Commission was formed in November 1920 and decided a competition would be held to select the design of the memorial that would be used at the eight European sites. In October 1922, the submission of Toronto sculptor and designer Walter Seymour Allward was selected as the winner of the competition, and the submission of Frederick Chapman Clemesha placed second. The commission decided Allward's monumental design would be used at Vimy Ridge in France as it was the most dramatic location. Originally, Clemesha's 'Brooding Soldier' design was selected for the remaining sites but was later, for a number of reasons, erected only at Saint Julien in Belgium. The remaining six sites at Passchendaele, and Hill 62 in Belgium and Le Quesnel, Dury, Courcelette and Bourlon Wood in France each received an essentially identical Canadian granite block memorial marker, differentiated only with brief inscriptions that describe the battle they commemorate in English and French on their sides. The blocks are situated in small parks that vary in shape and design and are typically situated on key points of the battlefield they memorialize.

The memorial at Saint Julien was unveiled on 8 July 1923 by Prince Arthur, the Duke of Connaught and the tribute was made by French Marshal Ferdinand Foch, former Supreme Commander of the Allied Powers on the Western Front. In his address, Foch stated:

"The Canadians paid heavily for their sacrifice and the corner of earth on which this Memorial of gratitude and piety rises has been bathed in their blood. They wrote here the first page in that Book of Glory which is the history of their participation in the war."

=== Design and location ===
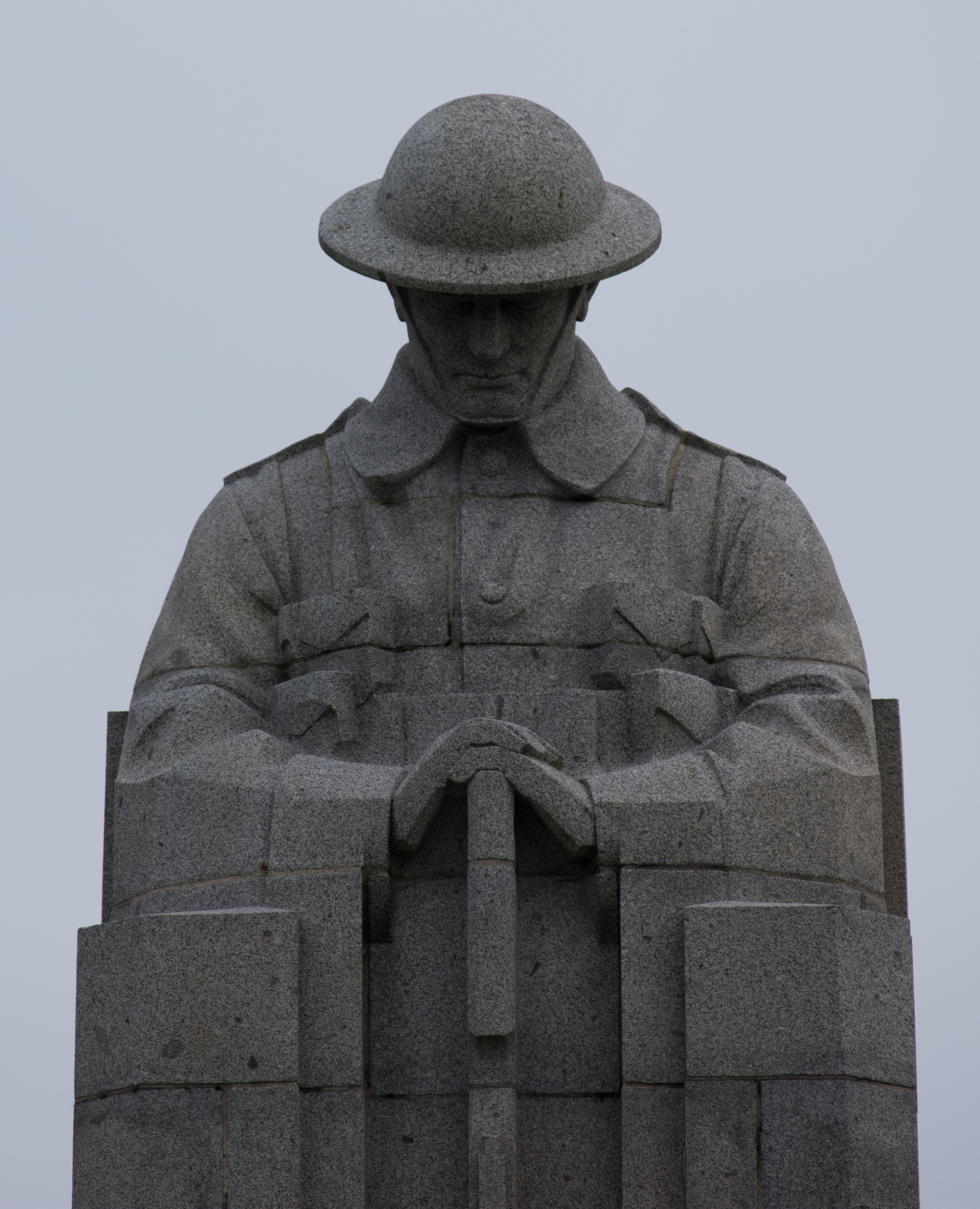
The top of the memorial.

The memorial is found on the northern fringe of the village of Saint Julien at the intersection of the N313 road and Zonnebekestraat. During the war, the location where the memorial is located was known as Vancouver Corner. Visible for miles around, the memorial stands 11 metres tall. The 'Brooding Soldier' column rises from a low circular flagstone terrace and is sculpted at its top to form the bowed head and shoulders of a Canadian soldier. The soldier's hands resting are on the butt of his down-turned rifle in the 'arms reversed' position, a pose used as gesture of mourning and respect for the fallen performed at funerals and services of remembrance. Surrounding the column and central terrace are gardens of tall cedars trimmed into the shape of artillery shells and low cut cedars trimmed to look like shell explosions. Some of the soil that nourishes the gardens of the memorial was brought from various locations from across Canada to represent the broad spectrum of Canadian men who fought shoulder to shoulder on the battlefields of 1915.

A replica of Clemesha's St-Julien monument was incorporated into the cenotaph designed by R. W. G. Heughan which was erected in Victoria Park, Regina, Saskatchewan, Canada in 1926.
