= Le Quesnel Memorial =

Canadian war memorial in France

Canadian Le Quesnel (Battle of Amiens) Memorial
- Canada
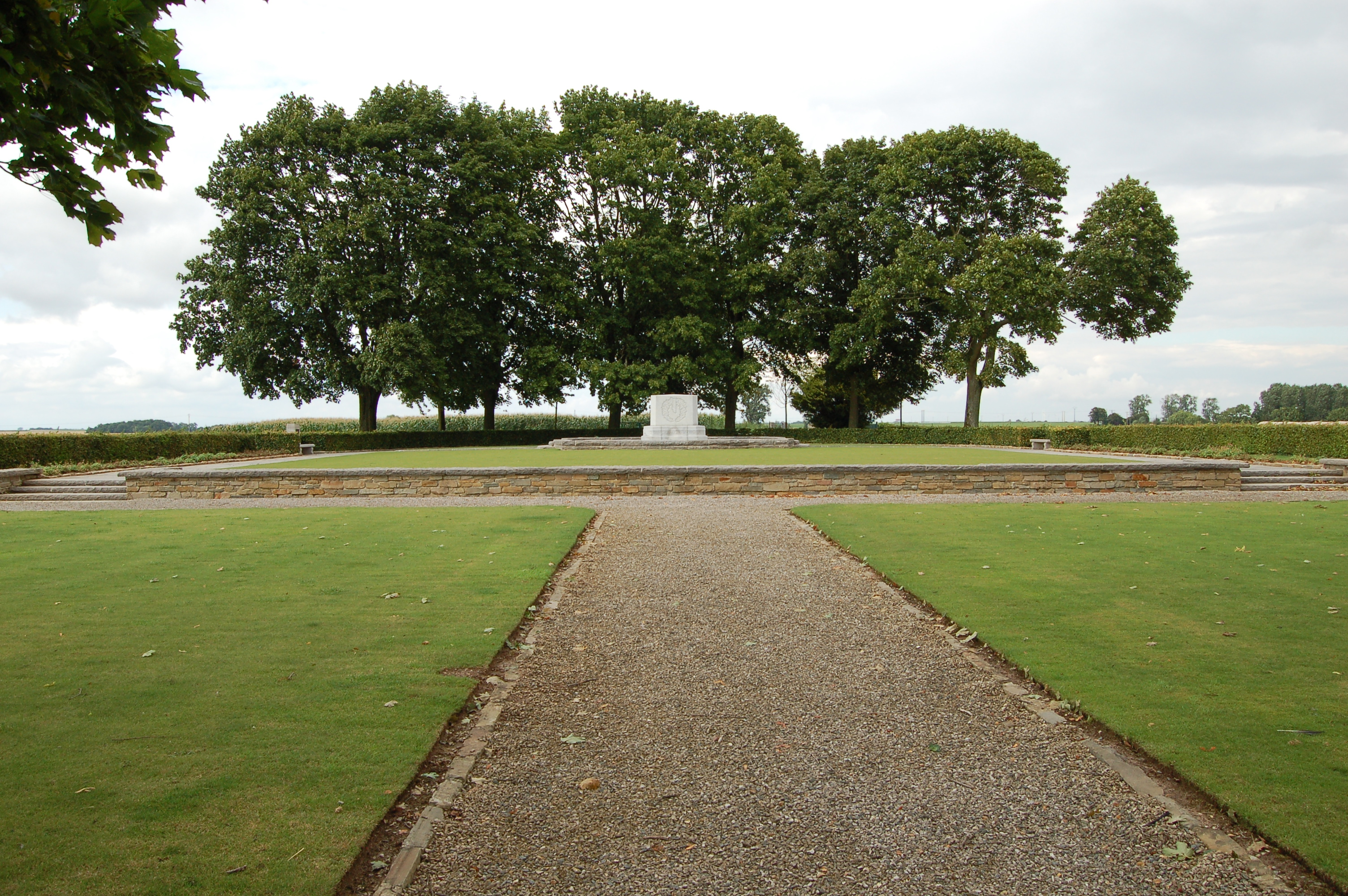
- Canadian Le Quesnel (Battle of Amiens) Memorial
- For the Canadian participation in the Battle of Amiens between 8 and 11 August 1918 and commemoration of the Canadian dead in that battle.
- Location: 49°46′29″N 2°36′34″E near Le Quesnel, France
- The Memorial's inscription reads: The Canadian Corps one hundred thousand strong on 8th August 1918 attacked between Hourges and Villers-Bretonneux and drove the enemy eastward for eight miles

The Le Quesnel Memorial is a Canadian war memorial that commemorates the actions of the Canadian Corps during the 1918 Battle of Amiens during World War I. The battle marked the beginning of a 96-day period known as "Canada's Hundred Days" that saw the crumbling of the German Army and ultimately the Armistice that ended the war. The memorial is located just to the southwest of the village of Le Quesnel (from which it takes its name), on the road between Amiens and Roye, in northern France.

== Monument ==
=== Selection ===
At the end of the war, The Imperial War Graves Commission granted Canada eight sites - five in France and three in Belgium - on which to erect memorials. Each site represented a significant Canadian engagement in the war and for this reason it was originally decided that each battlefield would be treated equally and graced with identical monuments. The Canadian Battlefields Memorials Commission was formed in November 1920 to discuss the process and conditions for a competition that would be held to select the design of the memorial that would be used at the eight European sites. In October 1922, the submission of Toronto sculptor and designer Walter Seymour Allward was selected as the winner of the competition, and the submission of Frederick Chapman Clemesha placed second. The commission selected Vimy Ridge in France as the preferred site for Allward's design as it offered the most dramatic location. Clemesha's 'Brooding Soldier' design was selected for the remaining sites but was later, for a number of reasons, erected only at St. Julien in Belgium. The remaining six sites at Passchendaele and Hill 62 in Belgium and Le Quesnel, Dury, Courcelette and Bourlon Wood in France each received a Canadian granite block memorial marker inscribed with a brief description of the battle they commemorate in both English and French. The blocks are situated in small parks that vary in shape and design and are typically situated on key points of the battlefield they memorialize.

=== Location & Design ===
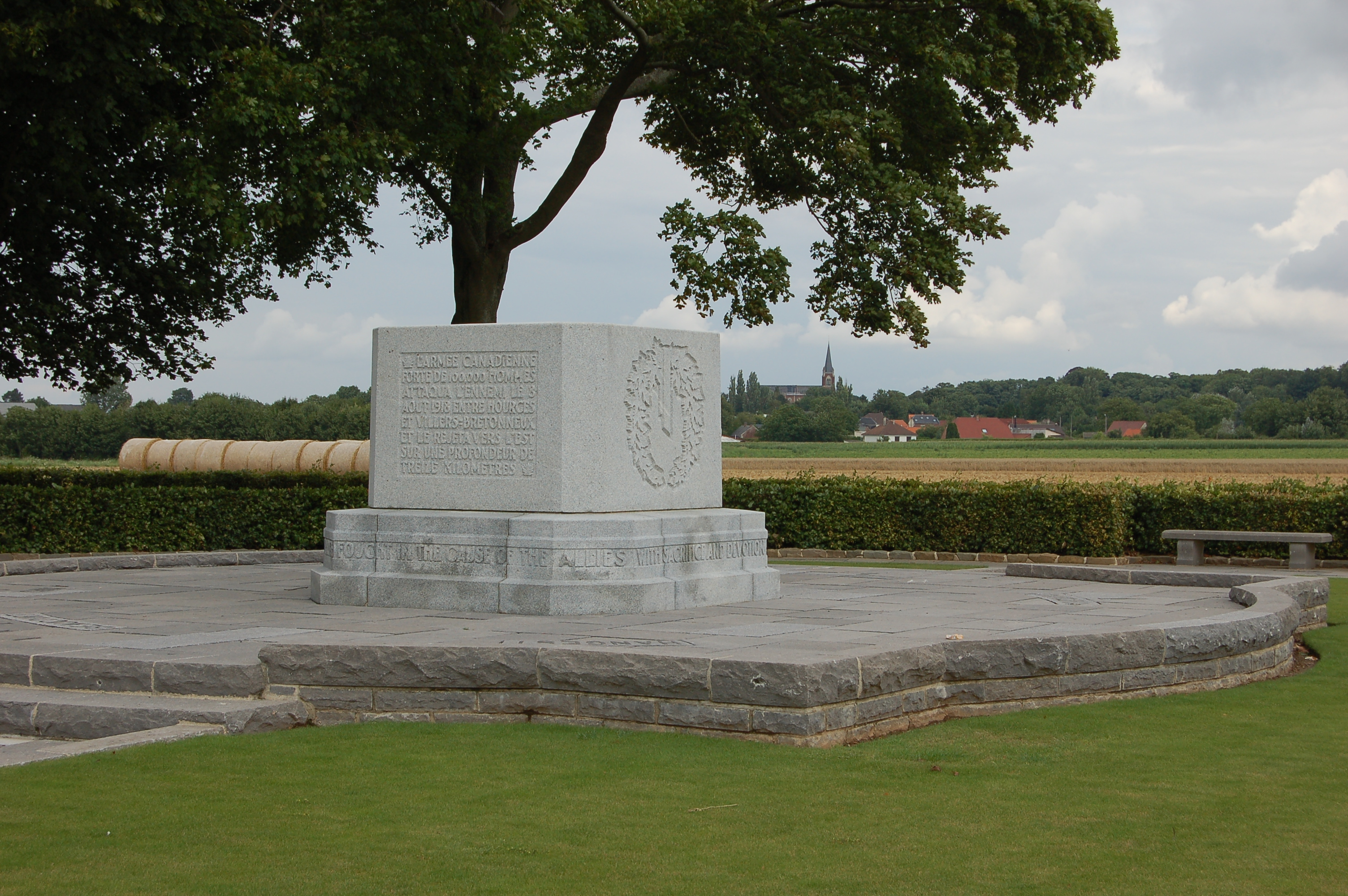
Le Quesnel Memorial, with Le Quesnel village in the distance

The site at Le Quesnel Memorial was selected because it marks the location of the deepest penetration the Canadians (and indeed any of the Allied armies) achieved on the first day of the Battle of Amiens, over 8 miles or 13 kilometres into German-held territory from their starting point. The Memorial is composed of a small keyhole shaped park situated beside the D934 highway between Amiens and Roye on the southwest fringe of Le Quesnel village. Fittingly, maple trees and a hedge of holly line the edges of the park and well kept lawns and stone pathways surround the low circular flagstone terrace that the granite memorial block rests on.
