= Courcelette Memorial =

Canadian war memorial in France

Courcelette (Battle of the Somme) Memorial
- Canada
- Canadian Courcelette (Battle of the Somme) Memorial
- For the Canadian Corps participation Battles of the Somme and the Canadian soldiers who made the supreme sacrifice in those actions.
- Location: 50°3′15″N 2°45′5″E near Courcelette, France
- The Memorial's inscription reads: The Canadian Corps bore a valiant part in forcing back the Germans on these slopes during the Battles of the Somme Sept. 3rd–Nov. 18th 1916

The Courcelette Memorial is a Canadian war memorial that commemorates the actions of the Canadian Corps in the final two and a half months of the infamous four-and-a-half-month-long Somme Offensive of the First World War. The Canadians participated at the Somme from early September to the British offensives end in mid-November 1916, engaging in several of the battles-within-the-battle, including actions at: Flers-Courcelette, Thiepval Ridge, the Ancre Heights, the Ancre as well as a small role in providing relief to the First Australian Imperial Force in the final days of the Battle of Pozières. The battles on the Somme were the first in which all four Canadian divisions participated in the same battle, although not together in a cohesive formation. The Canadian divisions suffered over 24,000 casualties.

== Monument ==
=== Site Selection ===
The Canadian Battlefield Monument Commission established after the Great War was appointed to select the location and design of the memorials to commemorate the Canadian participation in the First World War. The Canadian National Vimy Memorial at Vimy Ridge was selected as the national memorial site and seven other locations at Hill 62, St. Julien and Passchendaele in Belgium, as well as Le Quesnel, Dury, Courcelette and Bourlon Wood in France were chosen to commemorate significant battles the Canadian Expeditionary Force had engaged in. Each of the seven sites were to have an identical granite block inscribed with a brief description of the battle in both English and French.

The particular location of the memorial corresponds to the position the Canadians reached by the end of the first day of fighting during the Battle of Flers Courcelette, almost two kilometres from their starting point on the outskirts of Pozières.

=== Location & Design ===
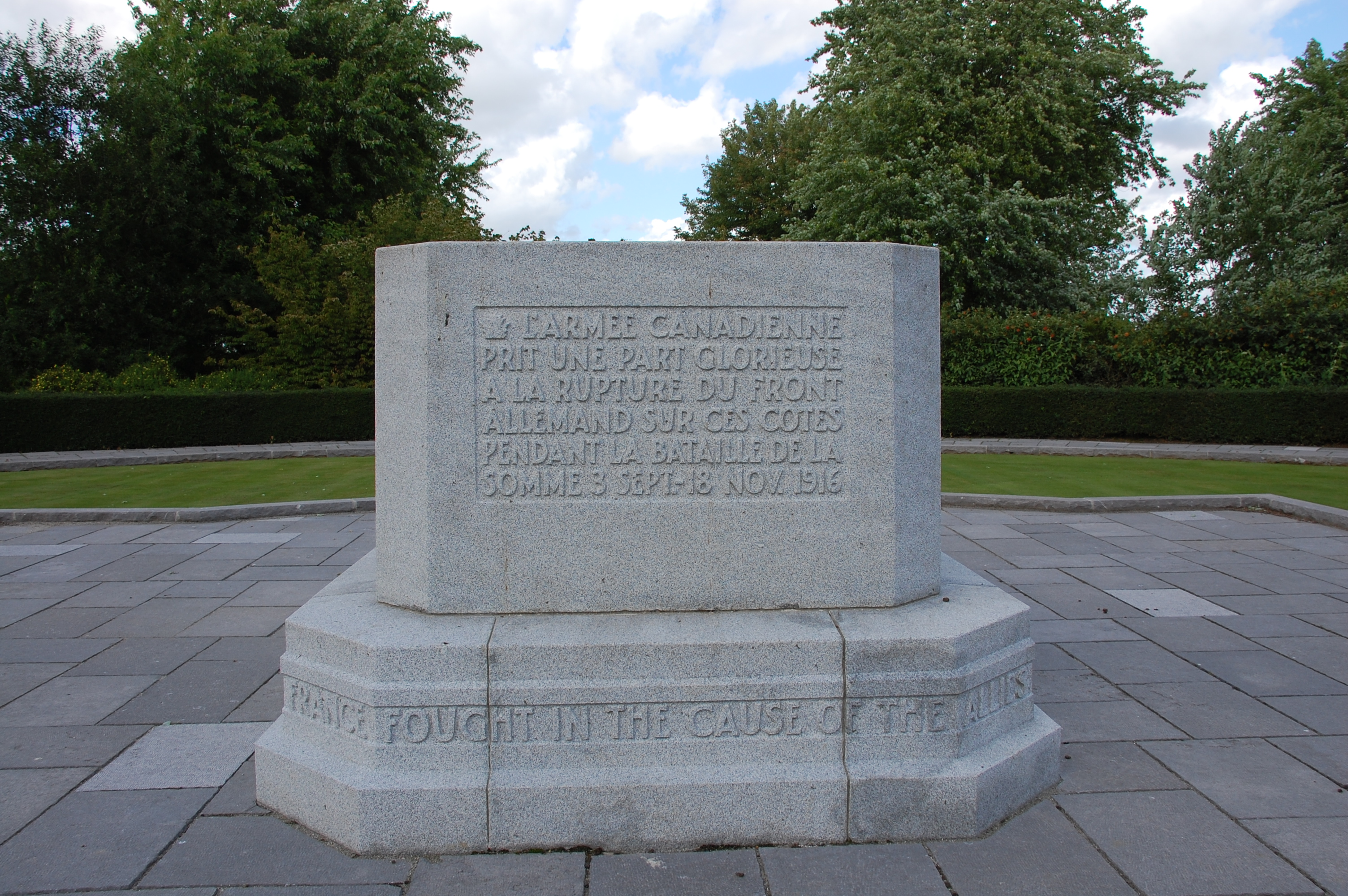
Courcelette Monument

The Courcelette Memorial was designed by Herbert Baker and sits beside the D929 (Albert-Bapaume) roadway, just south of the village of Courcelette itself. The site is a small square park with gardens of hedges and a variety of maple trees. The choice to not have a wide variety of colours in the gardens is a conscious attempt to help the visitor focus their visit on contemplating the considerable sacrifice and cost the Canadians shouldered during the battle. A Y-shaped pathway leads from the entrance to stone seats at several places around the outer edge looking out at the former battlefield. In the centre of the park the grey granite block monument is set on a low circular flagstone terrace.
