= Sanctuary Wood =

Belgian WW1 battleground

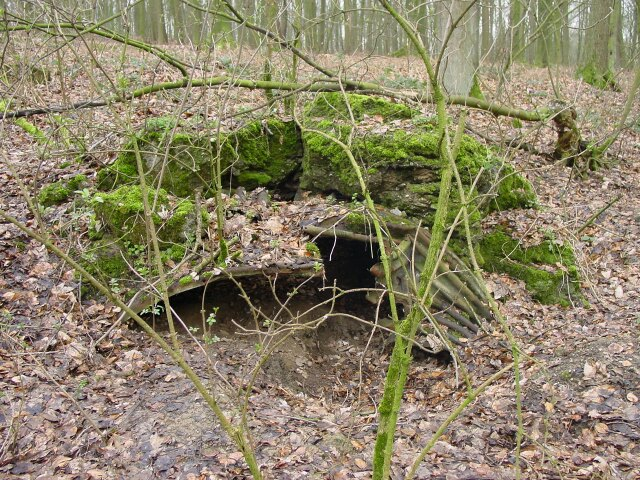
Sanctuary Wood, Zillebeke

Sanctuary Wood is an area east of Ypres, Belgium which was the site of fighting on the Ypres Salient in World War I.

== Memorials ==
- Hill 62 Memorial
- Sanctuary Wood Commonwealth War Graves Commission Cemetery
- Sanctuary Wood Museum Hill 62

== See also ==
- Battle of Ypres
