= Cone Mountain (Alberta) =

Mountain summit in Alberta, Canada

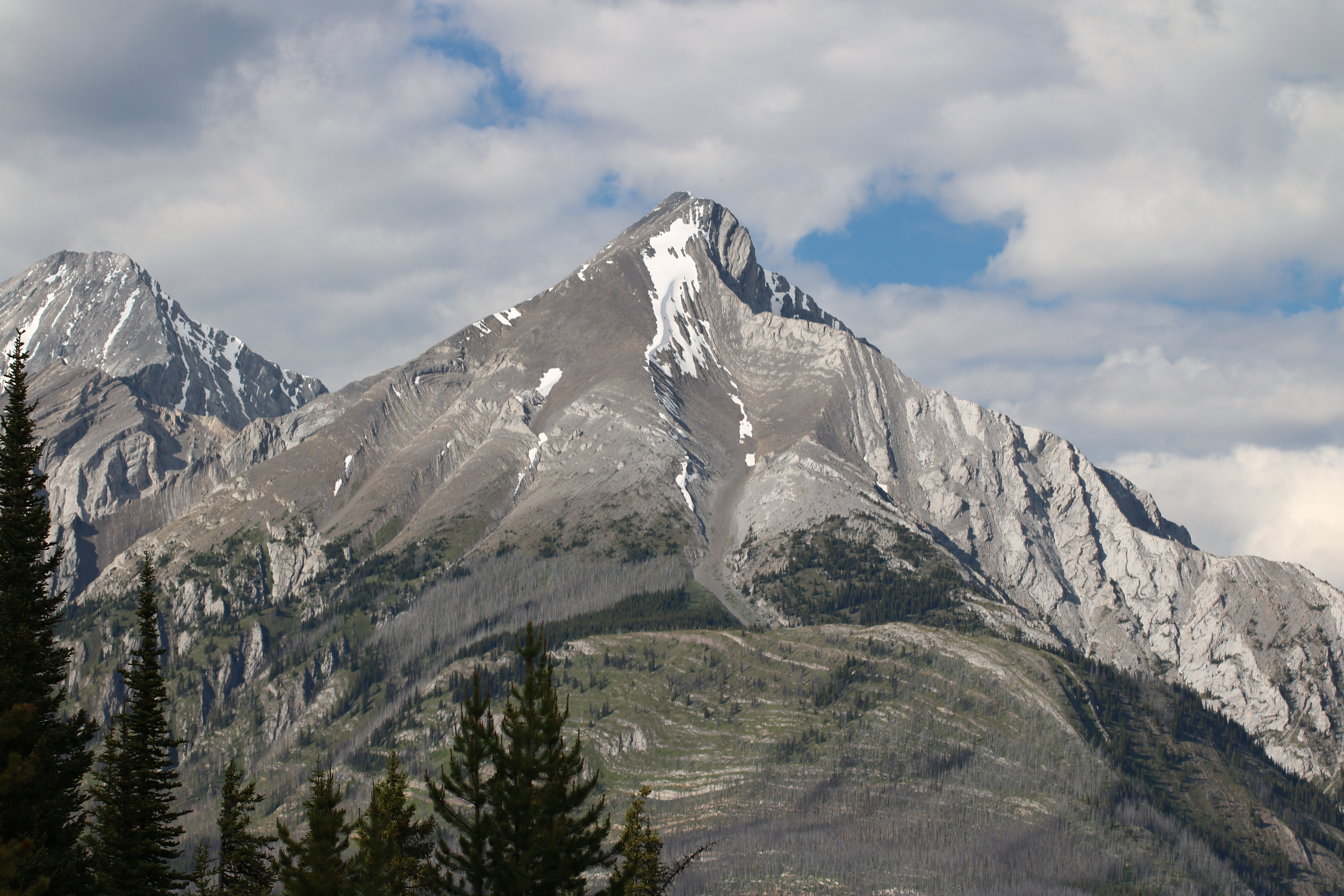
- Cone Mountain

Highest point
- Elevation: 2,910 m (9,550 ft)
- Prominence: 395 m (1,296 ft)
- Parent peak: Mount Mercer (2,970 m)
- Isolation: 5.43 km (3.37 mi)
- Listing: Mountains of Alberta
- Coordinates: 50°53′24″N 115°27′47″W

Geography
- Location within Alberta Location within Canada
- Country: Canada
- Province: Alberta
- Parent range: Sundance Range
- Topo map: NTS 82J14 Spray Lakes Reservoir

Cone Mountain is a summit in the Canadian Rockies of Alberta, Canada. It is the southernmost peak in the Sundance Range.

Cone Mountain was so named in 1915 on account of its shape. The mountain's name became official in 1924 by the Geographical Names Board of Canada.

== Geology ==
The mountain is composed of sedimentary rock laid down during the Precambrian to Jurassic periods. Formed in shallow seas, this sedimentary rock was pushed east and over the top of younger rock during the Laramide orogeny.

== Climate ==
Based on the Köppen climate classification, Cone Mountain is located in a subarctic climate zone with cold, snowy winters, and mild summers. Temperatures can drop below −20 °C (−4 °F) with wind chill factors below −30 °C (−22 °F). Precipitation runoff from Cone Mountain drains into the Bow River which is a tributary of the Saskatchewan River.

== Gallery ==
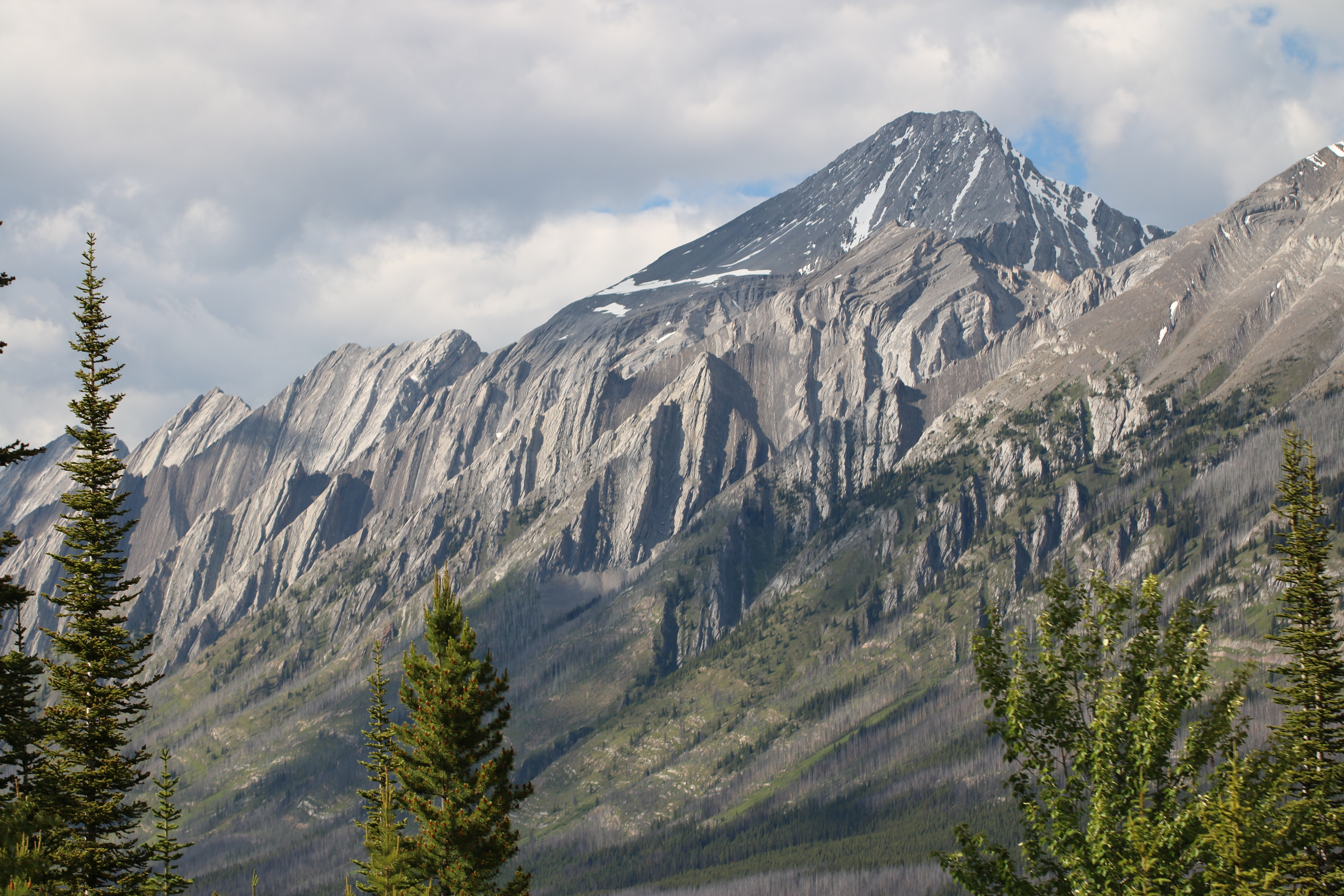
Cone Mountain

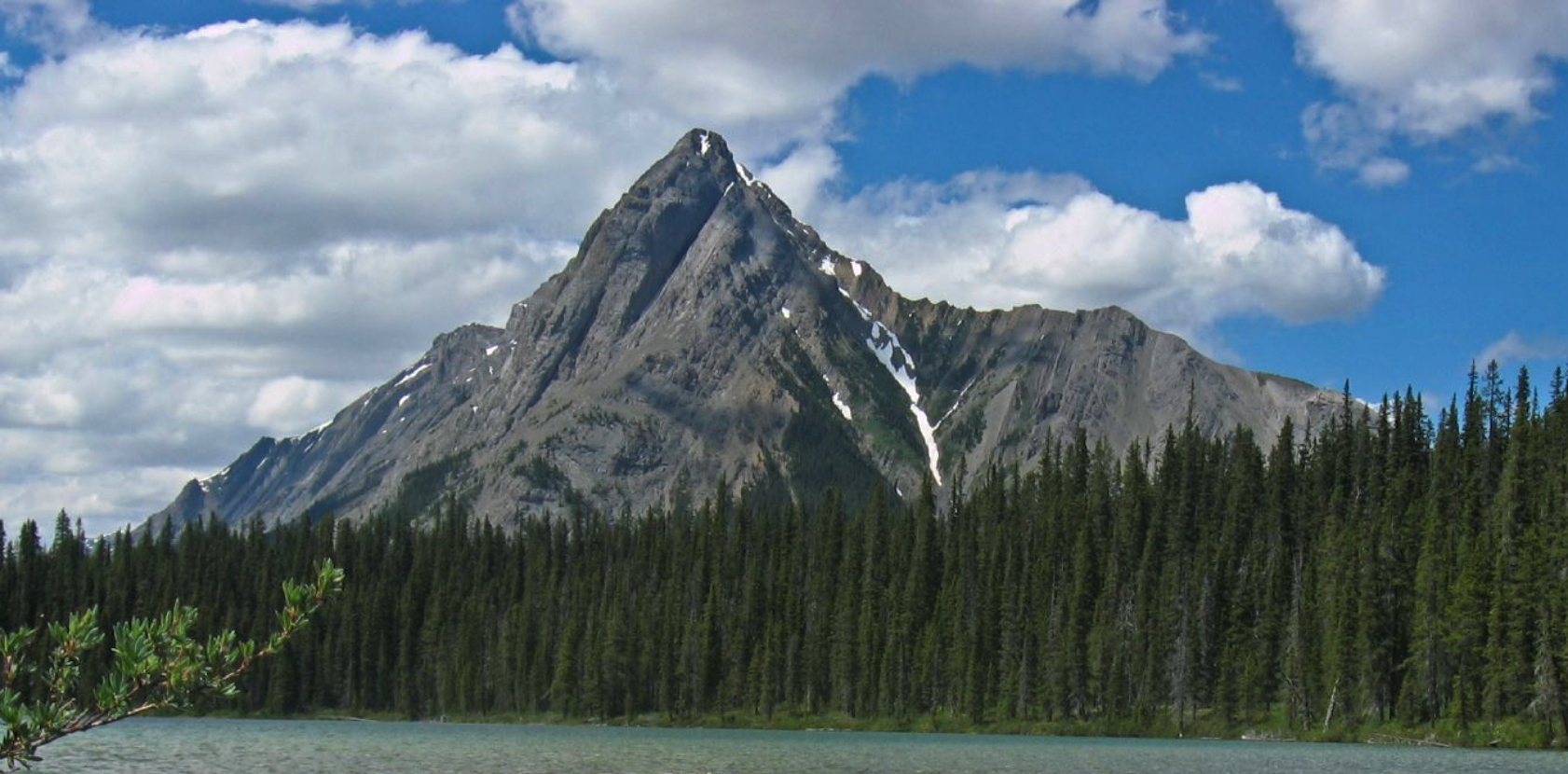
Cone Mountain

== See also ==
- Geography of Alberta
