= Sundance Range =

Mountain range in Alberta and British Columbia, Canada

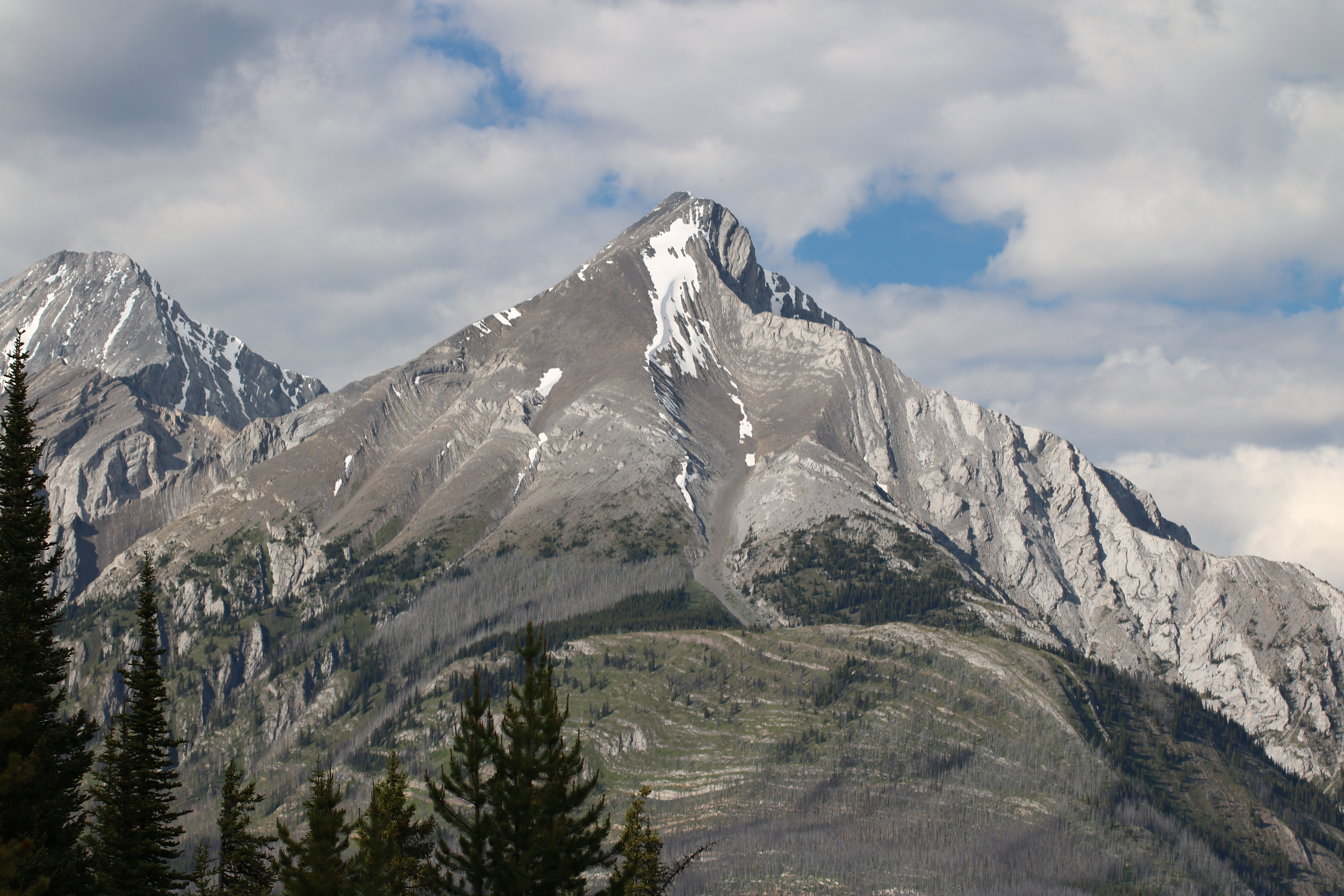
- Cone Mountain

Highest point
- Listing: Ranges of the Canadian Rockies

Geography
- Location within Alberta Location within Canada
- Country: Canada
- Province: Alberta
- Range coordinates: 51°02′35″N 115°34′17″W
- Parent range: Park Ranges
- Topo map: NTS 82O4 Banff

The Sundance Range is a mountain range in the Canadian Rockies, south of the town of Banff. It is located on the Continental Divide, which forms the boundary between British Columbia and Alberta in this region.

== Mountains ==
This range includes the following mountains and peaks:

Mountain/Peak	Elevation (m/ft)		Prominence (m)
Beersheba Peak	3,054	10,020	885
Mount Allenby	2,995	9,826	349
Mount Mercer	2,970	9,740	295
Cone Mountain	2,909	9,544	395
Sundance Peak	2,902	9,521	388
Mount Turbulent	2,800	9,200	654
