= Sundance Peak =

Mountain in Alberta, Canada

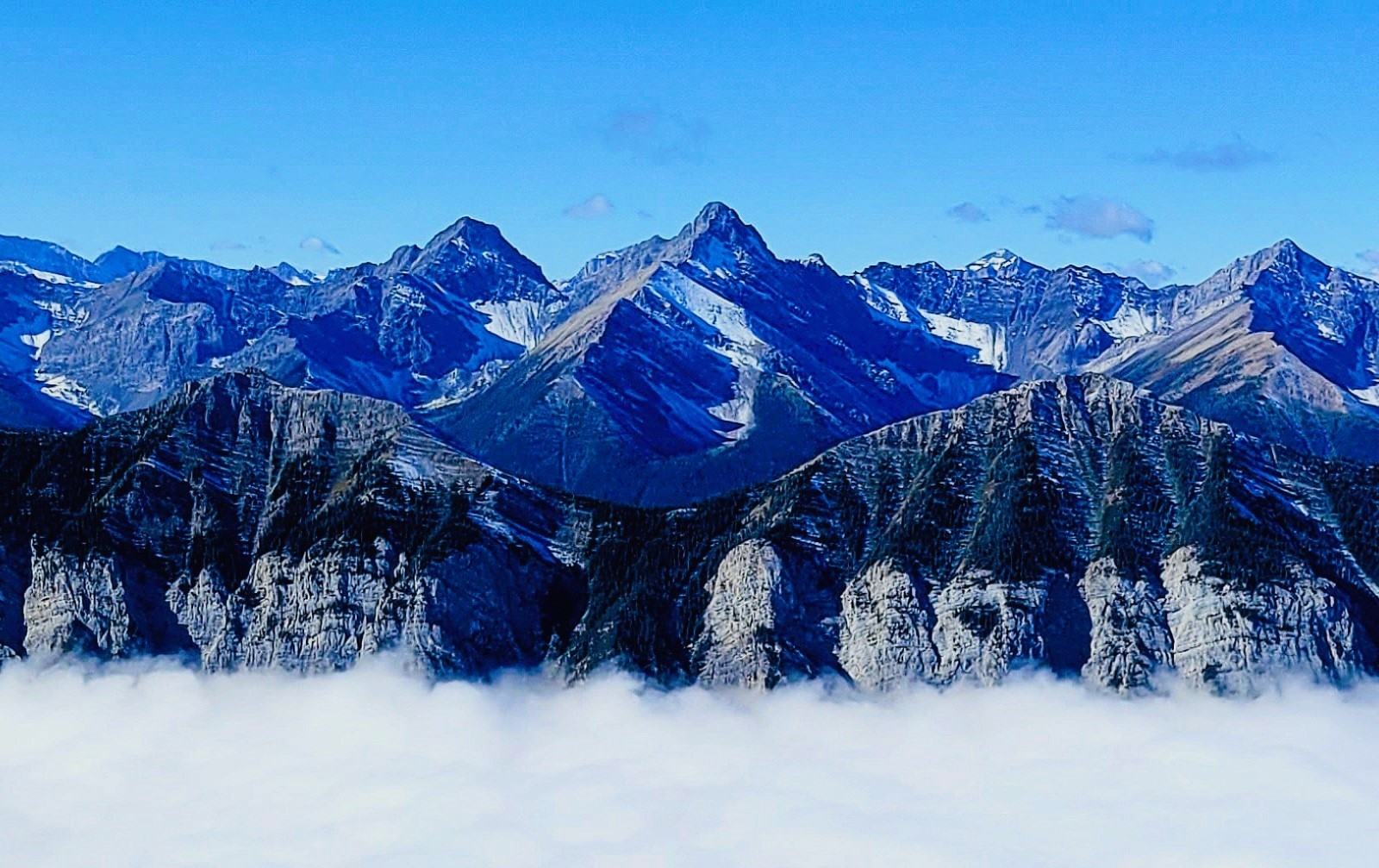
- Northeast aspect, centred on skyline

Highest point
- Elevation: 2,902 m (9,521 ft)
- Prominence: 388 m (1,273 ft)
- Parent peak: Beersheba Peak (3,054 m)
- Isolation: 7.72 km (4.80 mi)
- Listing: Mountains of Alberta
- Coordinates: 51°05′03″N 115°36′37″W

Geography
- Location within Alberta Location within Canada
- Interactive map of Sundance Peak
- Country: Canada
- Province: Alberta
- Protected area: Banff National Park
- Parent range: Sundance Range; Canadian Rockies
- Topo map: NTS 82O4 Banff

Geology
- Rock age: Cambrian
- Mountain type: Fault block
- Rock type: Sedimentary rock

Climbing
- First ascent: 1951

Sundance Peak is a 2,902-metre (9,521-foot) summit in Alberta, Canada.

== Geography ==
Sundance Peak is located within Banff National Park, 10 kilometres east of the Continental Divide, 10 kilometres south-southwest of the town of Banff, and is visible from Highway 1. It is situated in the northern end of the Sundance Range which is a subrange of the Canadian Rockies. Precipitation runoff from the mountain drains to the nearby Bow River via Brewster Creek, Sundance Creek, and Spray River. Topographic relief is significant as the summit rises 1,260 m (4,134 ft) above Brewster Creek Valley in 2 km (1.2 mi). The nearest higher neighbor is Fatigue Mountain, 8.55 km (5.31 mi) to the southwest. The first ascent of the summit was made in 1951 by M. Allen, R.C. Hind, and J.F. Tarrant. The mountain's toponym has not been officially adopted by the Geographical Names Board of Canada.

== Geology ==
Sundance Peak is composed of sedimentary rock laid down during the Precambrian to Jurassic periods. Formed in shallow seas, this sedimentary rock was pushed east and over the top of younger rock during the Laramide orogeny.

== Climate ==
Based on the Köppen climate classification, Sundance Peak is located in a subarctic climate zone with cold, snowy winters, and mild summers. Winter temperatures can drop below -10 °C with wind chill factors below -20 °C.

== See also ==
- Geography of Alberta
- Geology of Alberta
