= Mount Allenby =

Mountain in Alberta, Canada

- Location within Alberta Location within Canada
- Interactive map of Mount Allenby

Highest point
- Elevation: 2,995 m (9,826 ft)
- Prominence: 349 m (1,145 ft)
- Parent peak: Beersheba Peak (3,054 m)
- Isolation: 1.52 km (0.94 mi)
- Listing: Mountains of Alberta
- Coordinates: 50°56′22″N 115°31′58″W

Naming
- Etymology: Edmund Allenby, 1st Viscount Allenby

Geography
- Location: Banff National Park; Alberta, Canada
- Parent range: Sundance Range; Canadian Rockies
- Topo map: NTS 82J13 Mount Assiniboine

Geology
- Rock age: Cambrian
- Mountain type: Fault block
- Rock type: Limestone

Mount Allenby is a mountain summit in Alberta, Canada.

== Description ==
Mount Allenby, elevation 2,995 meters, is set within Banff National Park, four kilometers east of the Continental Divide, and is situated near the southern end of the Sundance Range which is a subset of the Canadian Rockies. It is located approximately 26.4 km (16.4 mi) due south of the town of Banff, 1.9 km (1.2 mi) north-northwest of Mount Mercer, and 12 km (7.5 mi) northeast of Mount Assiniboine. Precipitation runoff from the mountain drains into Allenby and Mercer creeks which empty to the nearby Spray Lakes Reservoir via Bryant Creek. Topographic relief is significant as the summit rises 1,115 meters (3,658 feet) above Bryant Creek Valley in 2 kilometers (1.2 miles).

== Etymology ==
Mount Allenby was named after Edmund Allenby, 1st Viscount Allenby (1861–1936), British Army field-marshal. The mountain's toponym was officially adopted in 1924 by the Geographical Names Board of Canada.

== Geology ==
Mount Allenby is composed of sedimentary rock laid down during the Precambrian to Jurassic periods. Formed in shallow seas, this sedimentary rock was pushed east and over the top of younger rock during the Laramide orogeny.

== Climate ==
Based on the Köppen climate classification, Mount Allenby is located in a subarctic climate zone with cold, snowy winters, and mild summers. Winter temperatures can drop below −20 °C with wind chill factors below −30 °C.

== See also ==
- Geography of Alberta
- Geology of Alberta
