= Malcolm Mercer =

Canadian general (1859–1916)

Major-General Malcolm Mercer CB
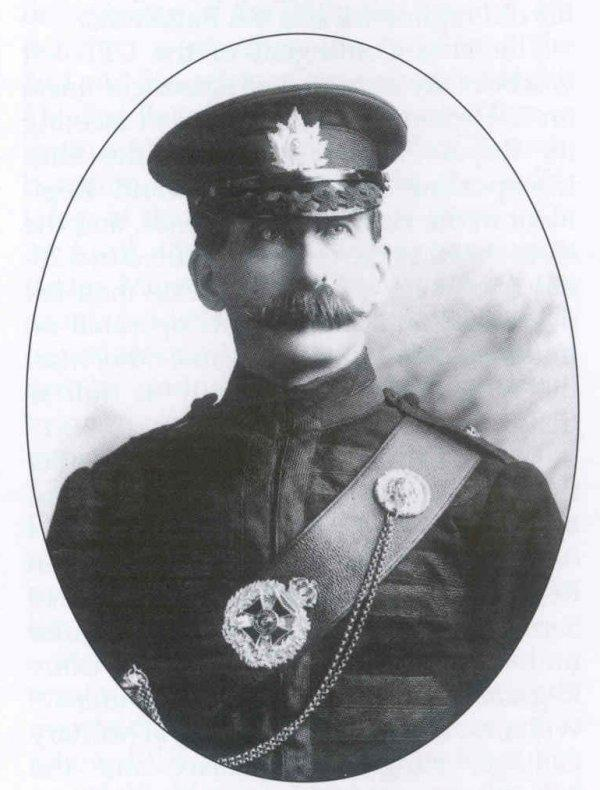
- Born: 17 September 1859; Etobicoke, Canada West
- Died: 3 June 1916 (aged 56); Mount Sorrel, Belgium
- Military career
- Allegiance: Canada
- Branch: Canadian Militia; Canadian Expeditionary Force
- Service years: 1881 to 1916
- Rank: Major General
- Unit: Queen's Own Rifles of Canada
- Commands: Queen's Own Rifles of Canada; 1st Canadian Brigade; 3rd Canadian Division
- Conflicts: First World War: Western Front; Second Battle of Ypres; Second Battle of Artois; Battle of Festubert; Battle of Givenchy; Battle of Mount Sorrel †
- Awards: Companion of the Order of the Bath

Major-General Malcolm Smith Mercer (17 September 1859 – 3 June 1916) was a Canadian general, barrister and art patron who practised law in Toronto and led the Canadian Contingent, then later the 3rd Canadian Division, during the first two years of the First World War before he was killed in action at Mount Sorrel in Belgium. Mercer was an experienced Canadian Militia commander and had demonstrated a great flair with training and organizing the raw Canadian recruits during the opening months of the war. He also demonstrated courage under fire, visiting the front lines on numerous occasions at the height of battle and personally directing his forces in the face of poison gas attacks and heavy shellfire.

Mercer remains the most senior Canadian officer ever to die in combat and was unfortunate to be killed at the opening engagement of the largest battle of his career, when he was trapped by shellfire during a front line reconnaissance and overrun during the subsequent German attack. The division Mercer created and trained remained one of the best units of the Canadian Expeditionary Force under his successor Louis Lipsett and Mercer was remembered by the men under his command, many of whom attended his funeral in the aftermath of the Battle of Mount Sorrel.

== Early years ==
Mercer was born in September 1859 in Etobicoke, a small town to the west of Toronto in Canada West. He was the third of nine children to Thomas and Mary Mercer and was raised in Delmer and St. Catharines. During his childhood he was educated at local schools and worked on the family farm before enrolling at the University of Toronto in 1881 to study philosophy. He graduated in 1885 and turned his attention to law, being called to the bar three years later. He established a practice in Toronto and had several partners, forming a highly successful but discreet firm, which he managed until 1914. Mercer never married or had children and reportedly he was "quiet and unobtrusive. He avoided publicity, moved little in society and in his legal practice preferred to keep his clients out of court, if he could."

During his years in the law, Mercer used his substantial income to support the arts and amassed a large art collection including many pieces by Carl Ahrens, of whom Mercer was a close friend and admirer. This art collection was auctioned off in 1925 and was found to contain a selection of art, porcelain, sculpture and antique furniture from around the globe. Mercer was also a keen amateur painter himself and was also an excellent sportsman who represented Canada and the Canadian Militia in shooting contests both at home and in Britain.

== Military service ==
Mercer's greatest passion however was reserved for the Canadian Militia, which he joined as a student in 1881. Posted to the Queen's Own Rifles of Canada as a private soldier, Mercer devoted much time and energy to the unit and became an excellent soldier and first-rate shot. Mercer rose steadily through the ranks of the militia, being made an officer in 1885 and a captain in 1891. In 1903 as a brevet major, Mercer led a company to Sault Ste. Marie to calm a riot by striking dock workers, his only deployment before 1914. In 1911, Mercer was promoted to Lieutenant-Colonel Commandant of the regiment and in 1913, Mercer was aide-de-camp to Defence Minister Sam Hughes during a military tour of Europe, during which he inspected the German Army first-hand and became convinced that war was imminent.

=== Outbreak of World War ===
At the outbreak of the First World War in August 1914, Mercer was amongst those immediately called upon by Hughes to establish and build the Canadian Expeditionary Force (CEF). Ordered to take his regiment to Camp Valcartier near Quebec City at 12.30 on 4 August, Mercer worked in his law office until 12.00 before arriving on time at the barracks in uniform. Within days he had been promoted to temporary brigadier-general in command of the 1st Canadian Infantry Brigade, which consisted of the first four battalions of the Expeditionary Force recruited in Ontario. Amongst these men his militiamen were dispersed, intended to spread experience and morale amongst the raw recruits. At the end of September, after just under two months' training, the brigade departed on the 20-day sea voyage to Britain as the first installment of the Canadian Expeditionary Force.

On arrival at Plymouth a British officer, Lieutenant General Edwin Alderson, took overall command of the "Canadian Contingent" as the CEF was then known and Mercer was despatched to Camp Bustard on Salisbury Plain, where he oversaw the training and organizing of the Canadian force to ready it for fighting in Belgium and northern France. Mercer performed well at this task, and an inspection of his camp on 4 November by King George V, Queen Mary, Lord Roberts and Lord Kitchener drew the compliment "No finer physique in the British Army. A fine brigade. Splendid." Mercer's fellow brigadiers in the CEF, Richard Turner and Arthur Currie, commanded similar training camps, and together the officers prepared their men for departure to France on 9 February 1915.

=== Second battle of Ypres ===
Dispatched for the Western Front, the Canadian Contingent was initially deployed near the Belgian town of Ypres, where on 22 April Mercer's men became embroiled in the Second Battle of Ypres. A German attack on French lines had caused massive casualties through the use of poison gas and Mercer's brigade was fed piecemeal into the battle as reinforcements by poorly coordinated staff officers. In a confused and bloody encounter the untested Canadian forces held back the Germans despite being forced to wrap urine-soaked cloths around their faces to counteract the chlorine gas. The next day, Mercer's men were directed to attack an escarpment named Mauser Ridge, an operation which failed because French troops ordered to support the Canadian line did not arrive. Mercer himself travelled to the front line to witness the battle and came under fire for the first time before retiring in order to remonstrate with the French officers intended to support him. The Canadian Contingent took very heavy casualties in the battle and subsequently all three Canadian brigadiers were made Companions of the Order of the Bath for their courage and generalship in the action.

During the year the Canadian Contingent was involved in further fighting, assaulting German lines in the unsuccessful battles of Festubert and Givenchy. In the aftermath of these engagements, the Canadian Contingent was reorganised into the Canadian Corps, consisting of two divisions led by Turner and Currie who were under the overall command of Lieutenant-General Alderson. Mercer was detached from his Brigade and placed in charge of coordinating the mass of small and independent Canadian units which were steadily arriving from Canada. During the autumn of 1915 Mercer was able to shape this force (which included dismounted cavalry regiments and British Indian artillery) into an effective infantry formation, and in January 1916 he was confirmed as Major-General in command of the 3rd Canadian Division, as this disparate force became.

=== Death at Mount Sorrel ===
In early June 1916, the Canadian Corps was again posted to trenches around the Belgian town of Ypres. The new commander of the Canadian Corps, Julian Byng, was inspecting the corps positions in front of a German-held rise named Mount Sorrel and noted that the Canadian troops were overlooked by German positions and under constant danger of enemy fire. The Germans also seemed to be digging new sap trenches which implied that an assault was intended. Byng ordered Mercer to make a reconnaissance of the front line and draw up a plan to overrun the more dangerous German positions in a local attack. Mercer complied on 2 June, conducting a standard inspection of front line Canadian trenches at 08:30.

Shortly after Mercer had arrived in the trenches, a massive German artillery bombardment began, heavy calibre shells destroying trenches and caving in dugouts, killing many Canadian soldiers. Mercer was trapped in a dugout and then stunned by a huge shell burst which wounded most of his staff and the officers of the battalion he was inspecting. The more badly wounded among the officers were transported to an underground field hospital but Mercer was left behind with wounded aide Captain Lynam Gooderham, and so was not present when the hospital was buried by the explosion of four mines which preceded a large-scale German attack. In the confused situation, Mercer and Gooderham attempted to escape the advancing enemy but inadvertently ran into crossfire, where Mercer's leg was broken by a bullet.

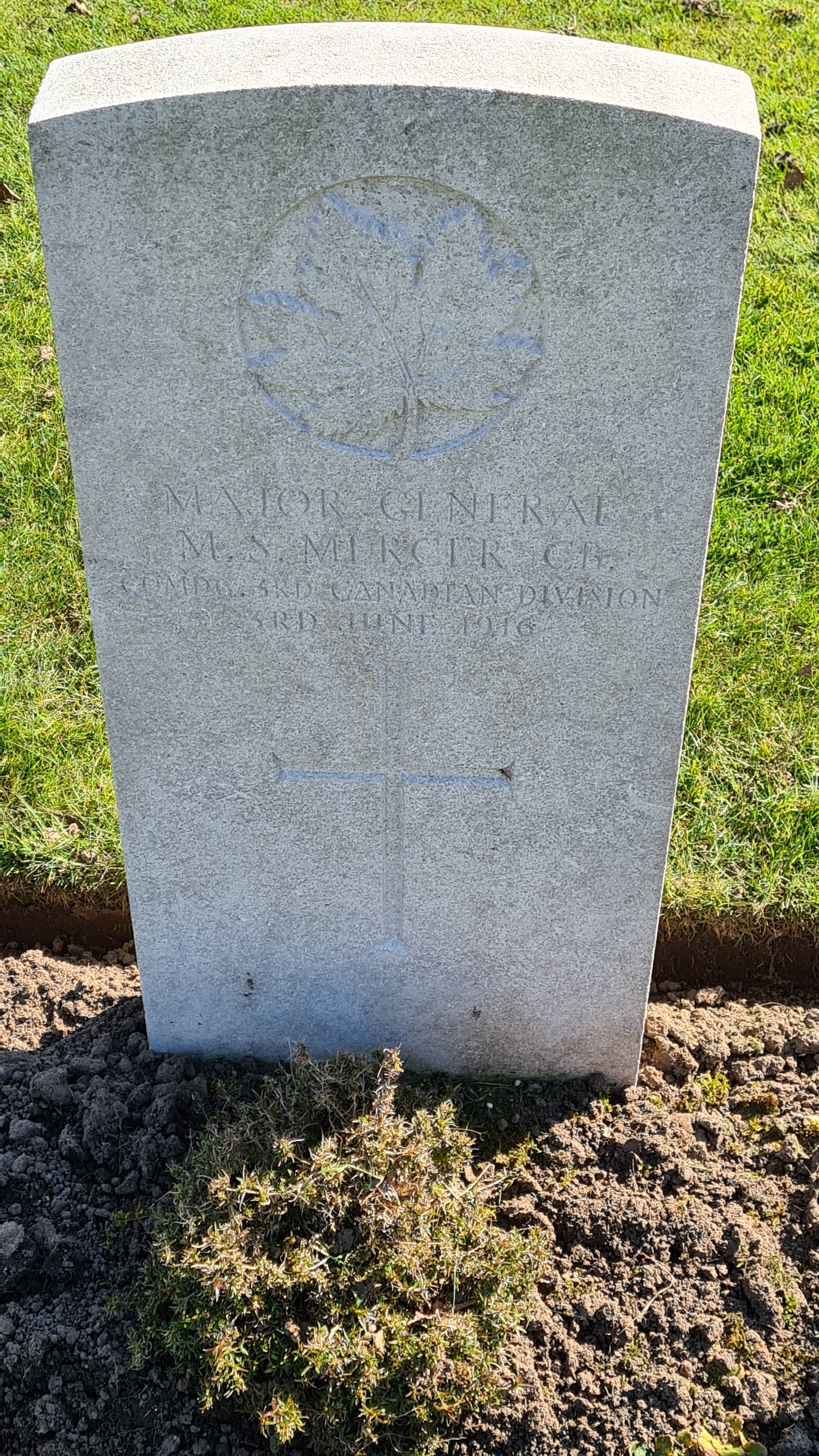
Grave at Lijssenthoek Military Cemetery

Mercer and Gooderham sheltered from the continued artillery bombardment in a battered trench, both suffering from the effects of their wounds, until 01:00 on 3 June. By this stage of the battle an artillery duel had begun between the armies who were still mixed together, Mercer and Gooderham trapped in between. At approximately 02:00 a shrapnel shell exploded in the trench in which they were hiding, further wounding Gooderham and killing Mercer instantly with shrapnel wounds to the heart. Gooderham stayed with his commanding officer's body until captured by advancing German troops who buried the general's corpse in a shallow grave at Gooderham's request.

The buried field hospital was also captured by the advancing Germans, and as a result nobody who knew of the general's whereabouts on the day returned to Allied lines. A staff officer later claimed that the shell which killed Mercer was British in origin, although it is unclear how this conclusion was reached. Believing Mercer to have been captured, General Currie assumed command of the battle and with the use of saturation bombardment was able to retake the lost trenches and drive the Germans back to Mount Sorrel despite heavy casualties.

On 21 June a Canadian burial party found 30 bodies in a sector of trench, amongst them General Mercer's remains, recognizable only by his uniform decoration. Mercer was buried in a military grave at Lijssenthoek Military Cemetery, later surmounted with a Commonwealth War Grave headstone.

Mercer's funeral was attended by many men of his division and from his old regiments as well as numerous Canadian and British officers who had worked alongside him. Mercer was posthumously mentioned in dispatches for his courage under fire, the third time he had been so mentioned, and his division was taken over by Major-General Louis Lipsett, who was himself killed in action two years later. Mercer is remembered as an efficient and capable organizer who never got the opportunity to demonstrate the tactical nous he had shown in training and exercises. He also remains the highest ranking Canadian officer to ever be killed in combat and reportedly by friendly fire.

== Legacy ==
General Mercer Public School in Toronto, originally built in 1923, was named after Mercer.

Mount Mercer in Banff National Park, Alberta, is named in his remembrance.

Malcolm Mercer was also an active Freemason. Following the armistice with Germany in 1918 steps were taken to create new Masonic Lodges in Toronto to accommodate returning soldiers looking to join Freemasonry, including a new Lodge in the West Toronto Junction neighbourhood of Toronto, which was instituted in 1919 and named the General Mercer Lodge in honour of Malcolm Mercer. The General Mercer Lodge remains active as of 2012, meeting at the same Masonic Temple in West Toronto where Mercer attended Lodge prior to the war.

== See also ==
- List of generals of the British Empire who died during the First World War

== Notes ==
Military offices
Preceded by New creation	General Officer Commanding; 3rd Canadian Division; December 1915 – June 1916	Succeeded by Louis Lipsett
