= Louis Lipsett =

British Army general (1874–1918)

Major-General Louis Lipsett CB CMG
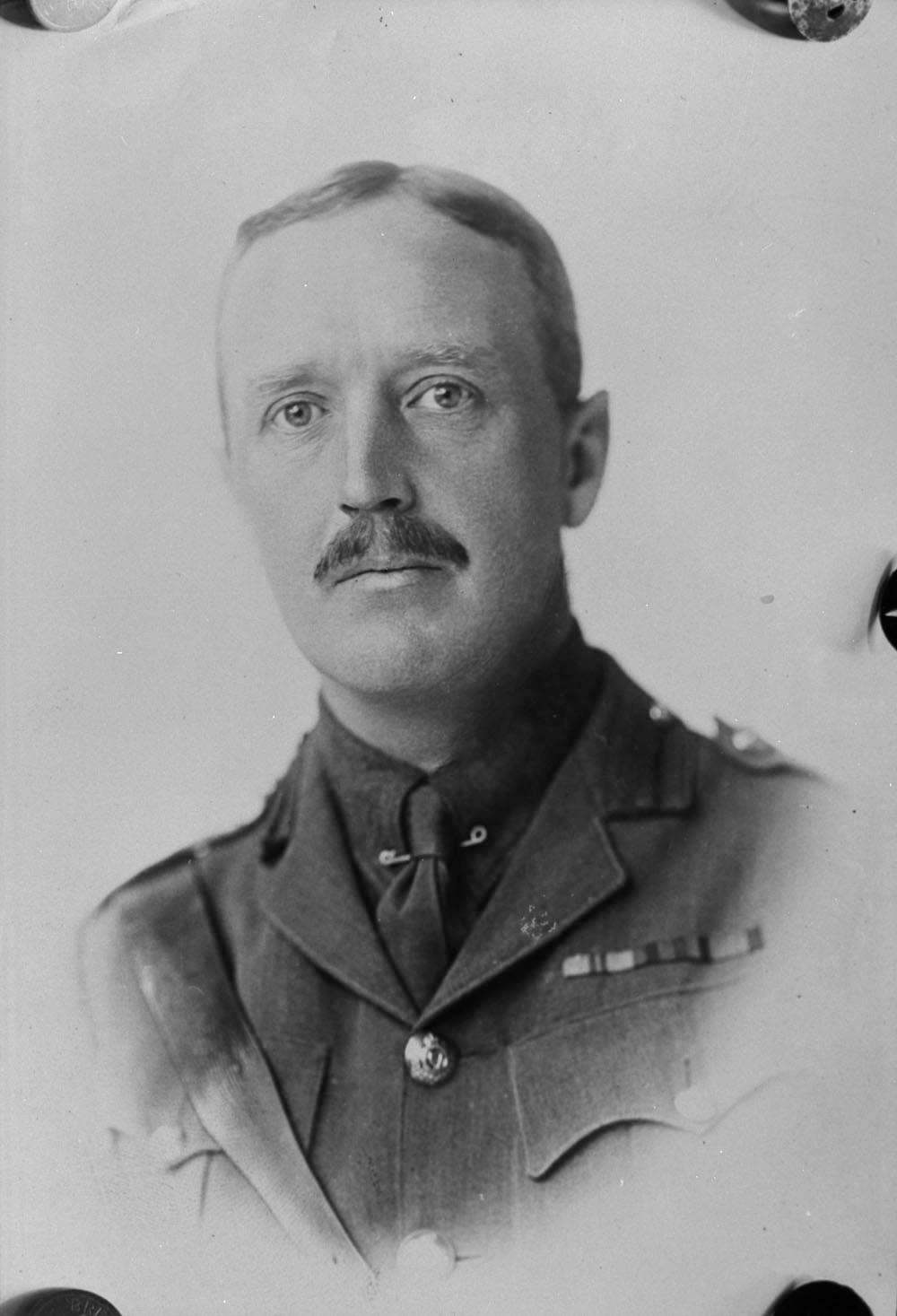
- Born: 14 June 1874; Ballyshannon, County Donegal, Ireland
- Died: 14 October 1918 (aged 44); Saulzoir, France
- Military career
- Allegiance: United Kingdom
- Branch: British Army
- Service years: 1894–1918
- Rank: Major-General
- Unit: Royal Irish Regiment
- Commands: 3rd Canadian Division; British 4th Division; 2nd Canadian Infantry Brigade; 8th Battalion (90th Winnipeg Rifles), CEF
- Conflicts: Tirah campaign; Second Boer War; First World War; Second Battle of Ypres; Battle of Mont Sorrel; Battle of the Somme; Battle of Vimy Ridge; Battle of Passchendaele; Hundred Days Offensive †
- Awards: Companion of the Order of the Bath; Companion of the Order of St Michael and St George; Officer of the Legion of Honour (France); Croix de Guerre (France)

Major-General Louis James Lipsett, CB, CMG (14 June 1874 – 14 October 1918) was a senior officer in the British Army and Canadian Expeditionary Force during the First World War. He commanded the 3rd Canadian Division during some of the bitterest battles of the war, taking over in 1916 after his predecessor, Malcolm Mercer, was killed. In 1918, Lipsett took command of the British 4th Division. Less than a month before the end of the war, during a reconnaissance mission observing German positions along the River Selle, Lipsett was killed. He was the last British general to be killed during the First World War.

A highly experienced officer, Lipsett had previously seen action in the Tirah Campaign and the Second Boer War with the British Army, serving as an officer with the Royal Irish Regiment. He was later instrumental in developing military training and education throughout Canada and expanding the shore defences of British Columbia, in response to the threat of the German East Asian Cruiser Squadron. An experienced and capable officer, Lipsett was popular with both his men and his superiors. His death was considered "a deplorable loss to the [4th] Division".

== Early military career ==
Born in Ballyshannon, County Donegal, Ireland, to Richard and Esther (Etty) Lipsett, in June 1874, Louis John Lipsett was raised in Merthyr Tydfil, Wales, and Bedford, England, following his father's death in 1887. He was educated at Bedford School and took the Sandhurst entrance examination against the wishes of his tutors, entering the college and graduating 35th from his class of 120. In October 1894, Lipsett was commissioned as a second lieutenant in the Royal Irish Regiment, and took ship to India where he served for the next five years, mainly with the 2nd Battalion of his regiment, on the Northwest Frontier, participating in the Tirah campaign against the Afridi. During these campaigns he conducted himself with distinction, being promoted to lieutenant in July 1897 but also contracting a near-fatal bout of cholera.

In 1899 he and his regiment were ordered to South Africa for service in the Second Boer War. Although he did not serve in any significant actions Lipsett performed his duties well, in 1901 was promoted to captain and on his return to England in 1903 was recommended to attend the Staff College, Camberley. In 1905 he returned to South Africa as a staff officer (deputy-assistant adjutant and quartermaster general), to aid in the reconstitution of the colonial government, a task he performed until 1907, when he was posted back to his regiment and promoted from supernumerary captain to captain in March 1908. Based at Aldershot in Hampshire, Lipsett conducted both regimental business and operated as an aide-de-camp to the commander of the 2nd Division, Major General Theodore Edward Stephenson.

In July 1911, Lipsett responded to the call from the Colonial Office for young staff officers to operate in colonial military academies, as military education had been standardised throughout the British Empire in 1909. Lipsett was sent to Canada and promoted to major (in December 1913), working hard to improve training in the dominion. He instigated numerous new training courses and special schools, establishing close ties with the Canadian military establishment and personally training most of the next generation of Canadian staff officers and generals.

== First World War ==
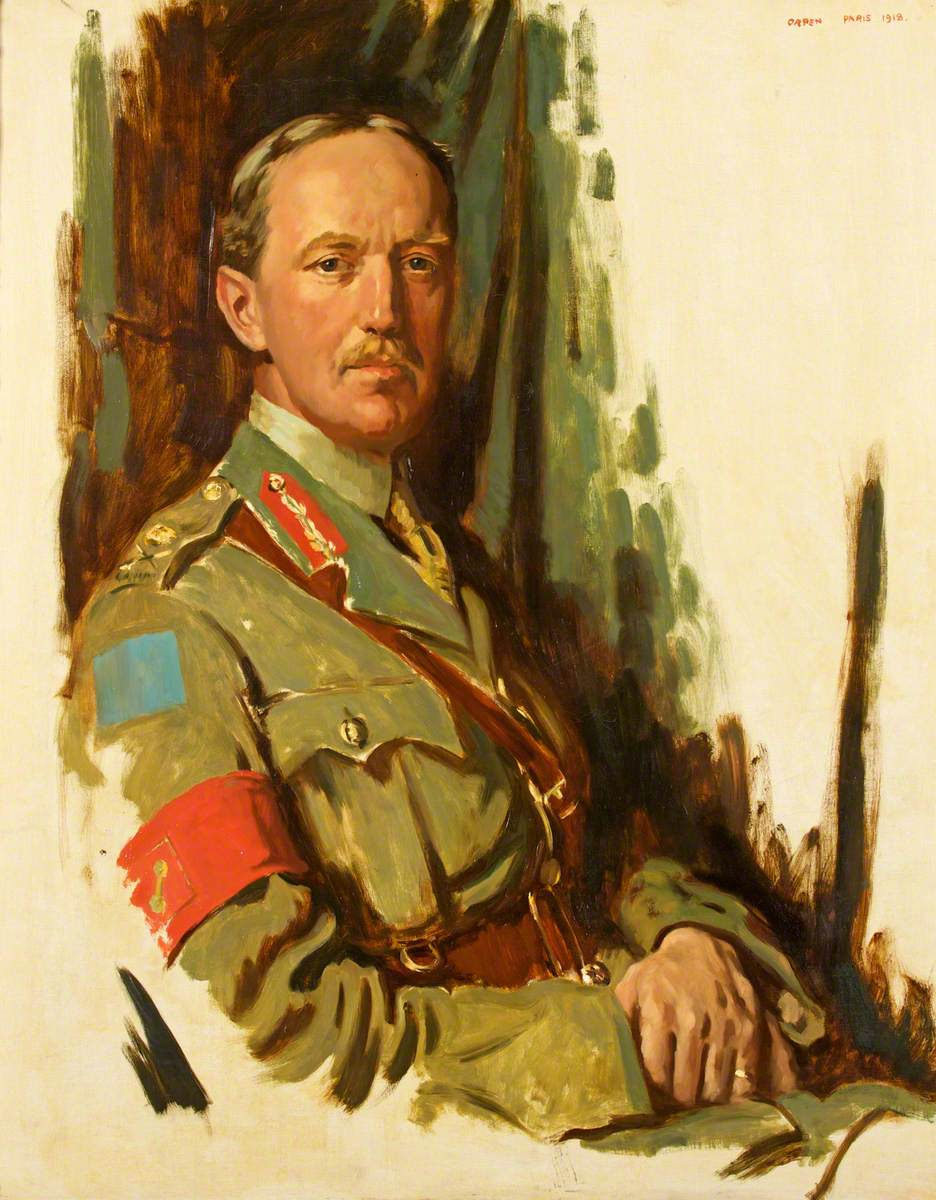
Portrait of Major General Lipsett.

At the outbreak of the First World War in August 1914 Lipsett was dispatched to British Columbia, the Pacific coastline of which was largely undefended and was believed to be at risk from the German East Asian Cruiser Squadron under Maximilian von Spee, which had embarked on a raiding campaign in the Pacific Ocean that would culminate in the Battle of Coronel and the Battle of the Falkland Islands. Lipsett recognised that there was no immediate threat to the Canadian coast and calmed fears whilst simultaneously organising the local militia forces and deploying the two submarines purchased by provincial Premier Richard McBride. His task completed in British Columbia, Lipsett took over command and training of the 8th Battalion of the Canadian Expeditionary Force (CEF), 'the Little Black Devils'. A friend recalled that as a commanding officer he was "always accessible and charming in manner, yet there was that about him which made him respected and no one ever presumed on his kindness, except the few old soldiers, who with their war ribbons up, and uncanny intuition, never failed to touch a soft spot in his heart."

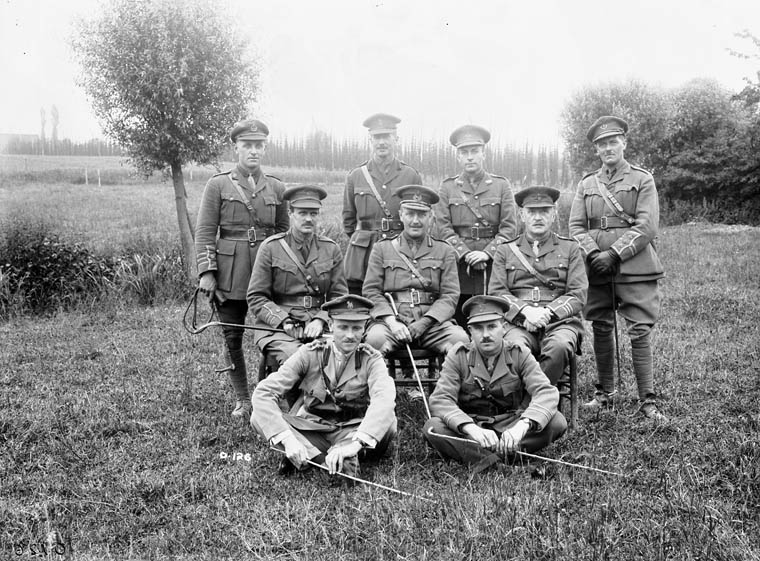
Lipsett (centre, second row), GOC 2nd Canadian Infantry Brigade, and members of his brigade staff, pictured here in June 1916.

In 1915 the 8th Battalion joined the British Army in France as part of the 1st Canadian Division. At the Second Battle of Ypres his troops faced the brunt of the German assault, involving the first use of poison gas in modern warfare. Lipsett is credited with issuing the first order to counteract the effects of poison gas, when he ordered his men to urinate on strips of cloth and tie them to their faces to neutralise the chlorine. Lipsett's battalion was instrumental in holding the line during the action and he was consequently rewarded by being made a Companion of the Order of St Michael and St George, promoted to the temporary rank of brigadier-general in September and given command of the 2nd Canadian Infantry Brigade, which he trained during the spring of 1916 to conduct major trench raids on German lines.

=== 3rd Canadian Division ===
On 2 June 1916, the 3rd Canadian Division's general officer commanding (GOC), Major General Malcolm Mercer, was killed by enemy shellfire at Mount Sorrel in Belgium and Lipsett was given an acting promotion to replace him in command of the 3rd Division, and a brevet promotion to lieutenant colonel. The Canadian minister of militia and defence minister, Sir Sam Hughes, attempted to have him removed from the division in favour of Hughes' son Garnet, but Lipsett was so highly regarded in the Canadian military establishment that Lieutenant General Sir Julian Byng, commanding the Canadian Corps, overruled Hughes.

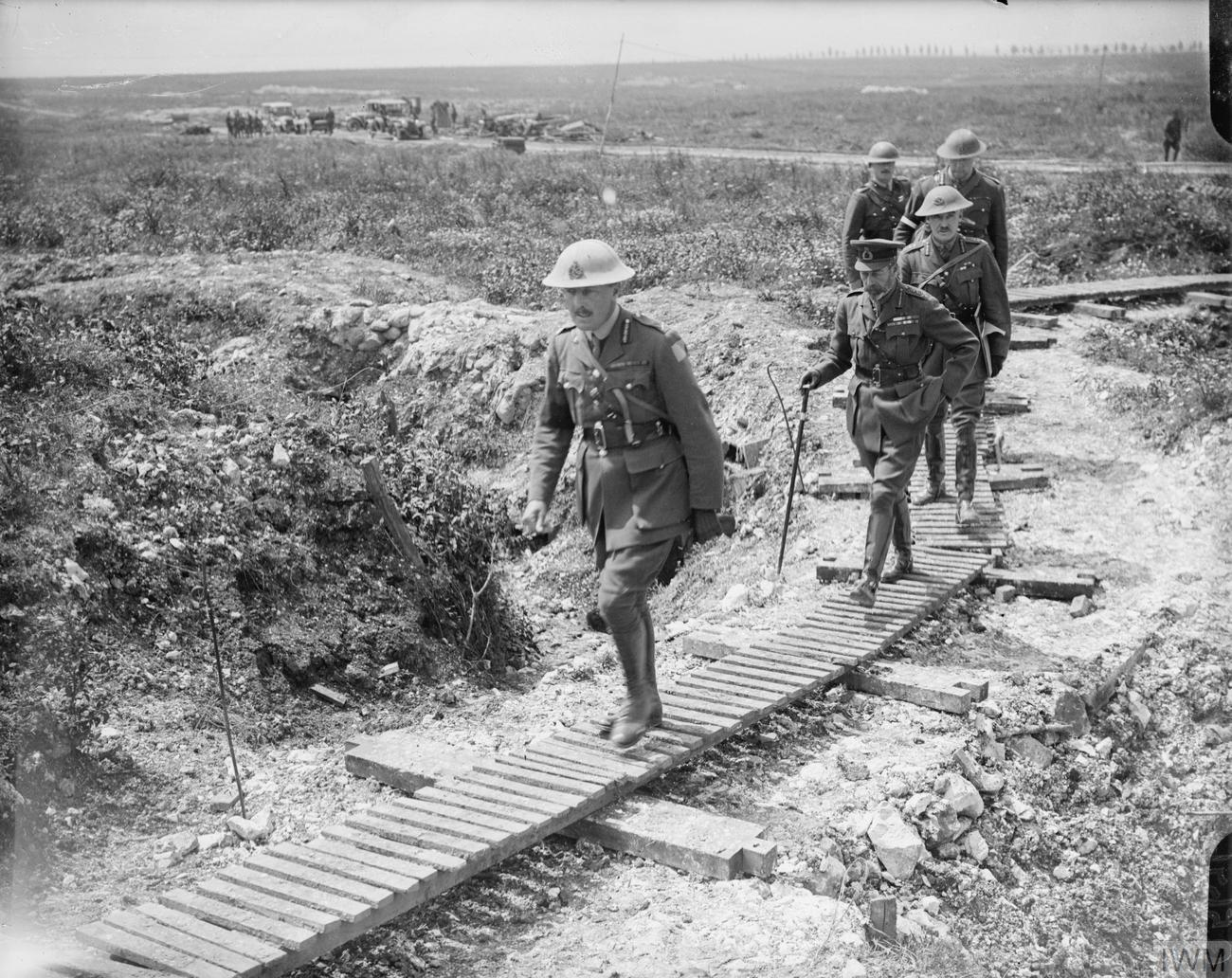
King George V visits Vimy Ridge, 11 July 1917. With him are Lieutenant General Sir Henry Horne, GOC British First Army, Lieutenant General Arthur Currie, GOC Canadian Corps, and two others, with Major General Lipsett, GOC 3rd Canadian Division, at the front leading the way.

Lipsett, promoted to the temporary rank of major general in June, soon after receiving the appointment, led his division through the worst of the campaigns in 1916, including extensive operations during the Battle of the Somme. He received two more promotions, to brevet colonel in January 1917 and to substantive lieutenant colonel in February, and in April Lipsett's division was instrumental in the Canadian success at the Battle of Vimy Ridge. The following September, however, the division took heavy casualties in bitter fighting at the Battle of Passchendaele. After each of these battles, Lipsett was forced to reconstitute and retrain his units with fresh drafts, so severe were the casualties his division took. By the time of August 1918, after the devastating German spring offensives earlier in the year, he was involved in the planning and execution of an assault on German positions by the entire Canadian Corps which is known as the Battle of Amiens which was completely successful and for which he was made a Companion of the Order of the Bath.

=== Death ===
Through the rest of August, he was engaged in combat with the 3rd Canadian Division. However, at the start of September, Lieutenant General Currie, Byng's successor as GOC Canadian Corps since June 1917, and Field Marshal Sir Douglas Haig, commander-in-chief (C-in-C) of the British Expeditionary Force (BEF) on the Western Front, arranged his transfer to the command of the 4th Division of the BEF, taking over from Major General Torquil Matheson, in order that the Canadian Corps be entirely officered by Canadians.

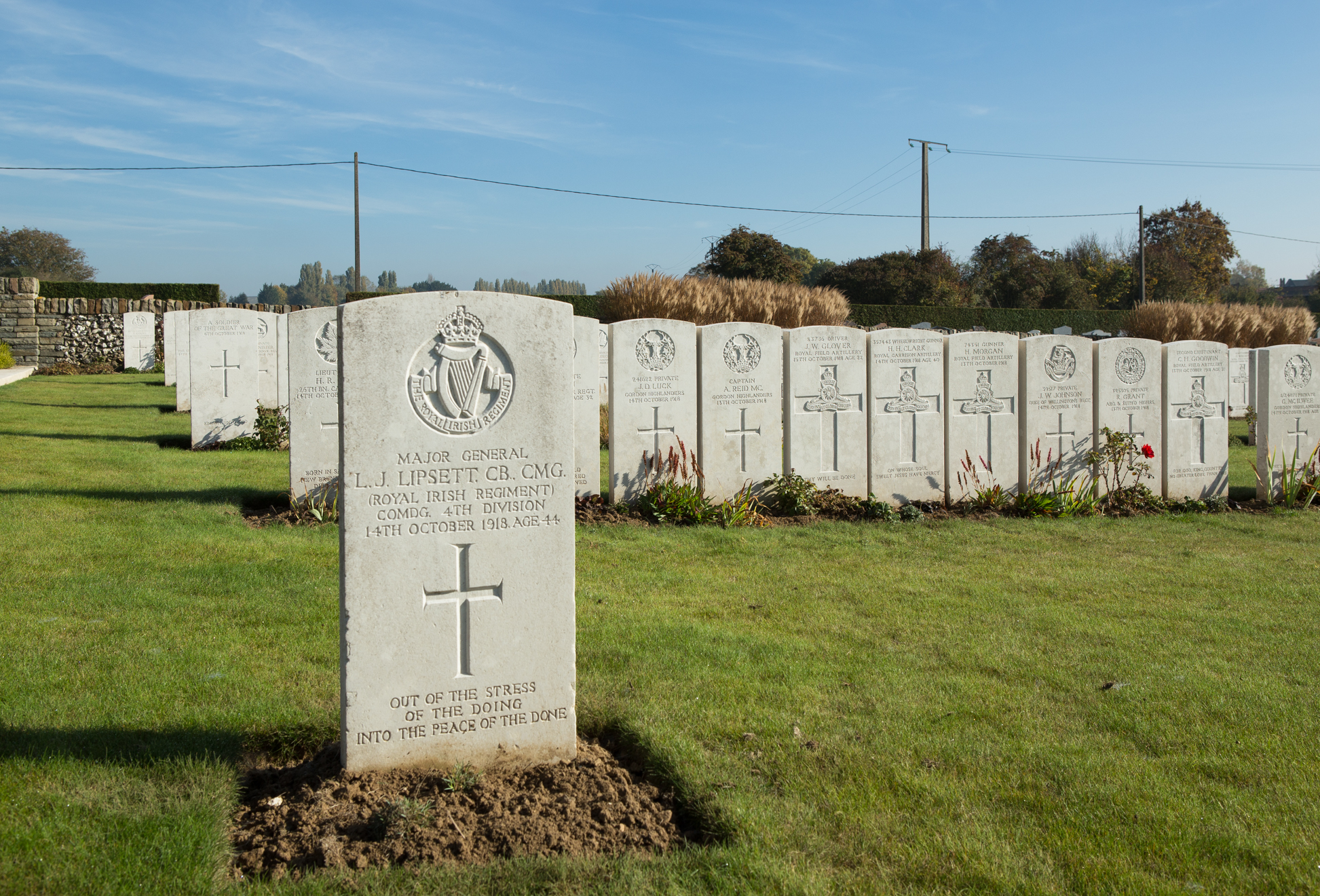
The grave of Major General Louis Lipsett.

Although Lipsett was unhappy about the transfer, he acquiesced and took energetic command of the division during the Hundred Days Offensive.

On 14 October 1918, whilst planning an assault at Saulzoir in France he was crawling along a bank overlooking the River Selle with several officers of his own staff and some of the 49th (West Riding) Division, when at about 3:15 in the afternoon the party was spotted and a German machine gun opened fire from across the river. The party went to ground but a single bullet struck Lipsett in the face. He was able to stagger back to his own lines but there collapsed from massive blood loss and never regained consciousness.

Aged forty-four, he was the last and youngest British general to be killed in frontline action during the First World War. Lipsett was buried the following day in Quéant Communal Cemetery with his funeral attended by dozens of officers from the British and Canadian forces in France including Byng and Lipsett's close friend and corps commander, Currie. The burial party was provided by the unit he had entered the war in command of, the 8th Battalion, C.E.F., and amongst the mourners was the Edward, the Prince of Wales. After the war he was posthumously awarded the Officer of the Legion of Honour and the Croix de Guerre by the French government. The Imperial War Graves Commission headstone erected over Lipsett's grave bears the inscription: OUT OF THE STRESS OF THE DOING / INTO THE PEACE OF THE DONE.

Lipsett, the last of nine British divisional commanders to be killed or die of wounds during the war, (Note: The other fatalities were: Hubert Hamilton, GOC 3rd Division, Samuel Lomax, GOC 1st Division, Thompson Capper, GOC 7th Division, George Thesiger, GOC 9th (Scottish) Division, Frederick Wing, GOC 12th (Eastern) Division, Edward Ingouville-Williams, GOC 34th Division, Robert Broadwood, GOC 57th (2nd West Lancashire) Division, and Edward Feetham, GOC 39th Division.) is remembered in the Dictionary of Canadian Biography as "arguably the best" Canadian officer of the Great War, "a shrewd and thoughtful tactician whose pre-war professional dedication paid off under fire from Ypres to Amiens" and who "set an example of fearlessness and disregard of danger to those under him at all times and in all places; in fact to lead and not to follow was the ideal which he set for himself and lived up to the end."

== See also ==
- List of generals of the British Empire who died during the First World War

== Sources ==
- Davies, Frank (1997). Bloody Red Tabs: General Officer Casualties of the Great War 1914–1918. London: Pen & Sword Books. ISBN 978-0-85052-463-5.
- "Lipsett, Louis James". Dictionary of Canadian Biography.
- "Who's Who: Louis James Lipsett". First World War.com.
- "casualty details: Lipsett, Louis James". Commonwealth War Graves Commission.
- "Photo Collection Relating to Louis james Lipsett". Veteran Affairs Canada.

Military offices
Preceded by Malcolm Mercer	GOC 3rd Canadian Division; 1916–1918	Succeeded by Frederick Oscar Warren Loomis
Preceded by Torquhil Matheson	GOC 4th Division; September–October 1918	Succeeded by Cuthbert Lucas
