= Mount Mercer (Alberta) =

Mountain in Alberta, Canada

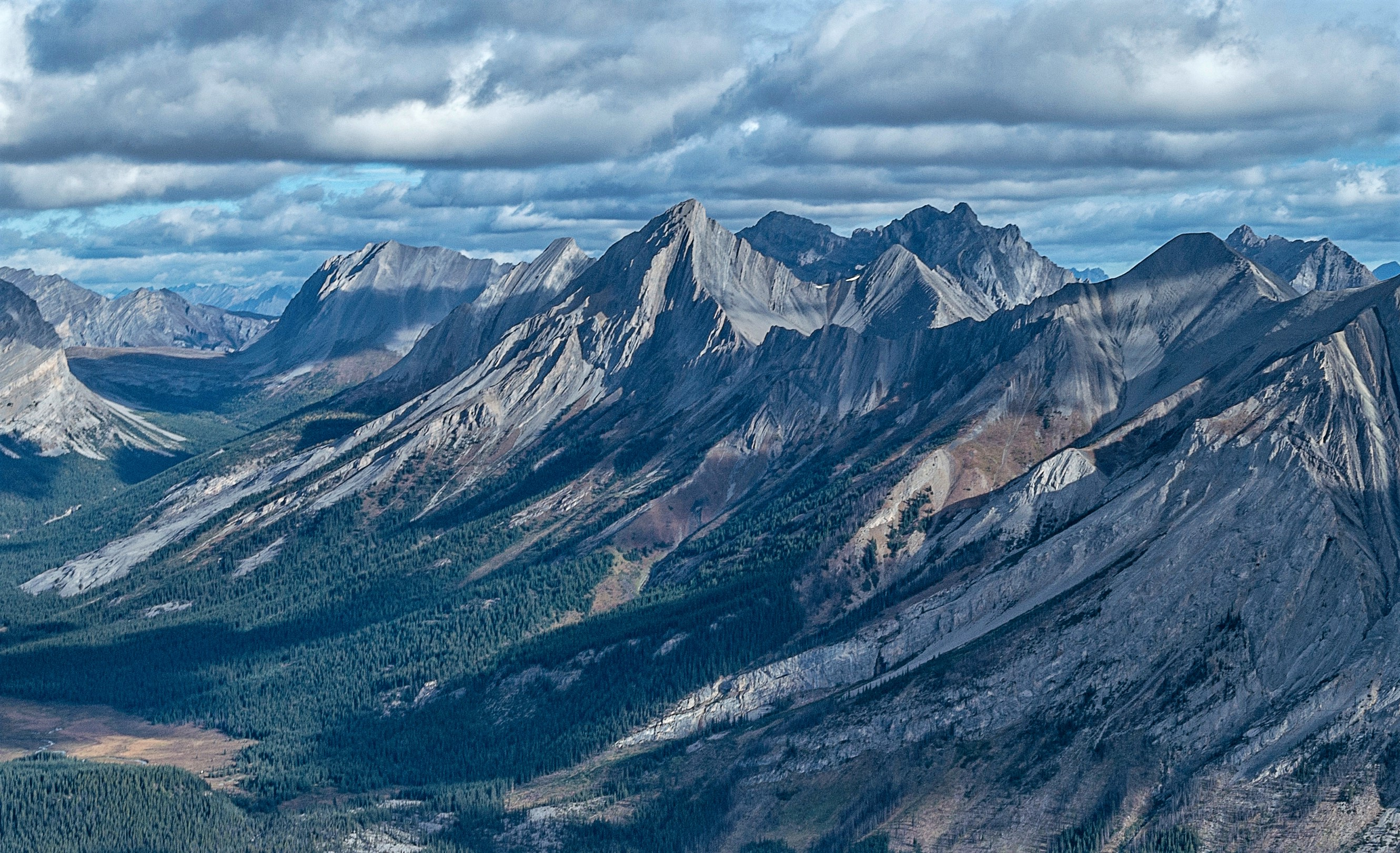
- South aspect of Mount Mercer (centre)

Highest point
- Elevation: 2,970 m (9,740 ft)
- Prominence: 295 m (968 ft)
- Parent peak: Beersheba Peak (3,054 m)
- Isolation: 1.93 km (1.20 mi)
- Listing: Mountains of Alberta
- Coordinates: 50°55′24″N 115°31′13″W

Naming
- Etymology: Malcolm Mercer

Geography
- Location within Alberta Location within Canada
- Interactive map of Mount Mercer
- Country: Canada
- Province: Alberta
- Protected area: Banff National Park
- Parent range: Sundance Range; Canadian Rockies
- Topo map: NTS 82J13 Mount Assiniboine

Geology
- Rock age: Cambrian
- Mountain type: Fault block
- Rock type: Limestone

Mount Mercer is a 2,970-metre (9,744-foot) mountain summit located in Alberta, Canada.

== Geography ==
Mount Mercer is set within Banff National Park, three kilometres east of the Continental Divide, and is situated near the southern end of the Sundance Range, which is a sub-range of the Canadian Rockies. Located four kilometres east of Assiniboine Pass, Mount Mercer is a remote peak which is not visible from any road. Mount Mercer's nearest higher neighbor is Mount Allenby, 1.9 km (1.2 mi) to the north-northwest, and Mount Assiniboine is 10 km (6.2 mi) to the southwest. Precipitation runoff from the mountain drains into Mercer and Bryant creeks which empty to the nearby Spray Lakes Reservoir. Topographic relief is significant as the summit rises 1,130 m (3,710 ft) above Bryant Creek Valley in less than 2 km (1.2 mi).

== Geology ==
Mount Mercer is composed of limestone which is a sedimentary rock laid down during the Precambrian to Jurassic periods. Formed in shallow seas, this sedimentary rock was pushed east and over the top of younger rock during the Laramide orogeny.

== Climate ==
Based on the Köppen climate classification, Mount Mercer is located in a subarctic climate zone with cold, snowy winters, and mild summers. Winter temperatures can drop below −20 °C with wind chill factors below −30 °C.

== Etymology ==
Mount Mercer is named in remembrance of Major-General Malcolm Mercer (1859–1916), a Canadian general who led the 3rd Canadian Division during the First World War before he was killed in action at Mount Sorrel in Belgium on June 2, 1916. He was the highest ranking Canadian killed in the war. The mountain's toponym was officially adopted in 1924 by the Geographical Names Board of Canada.

== Gallery ==
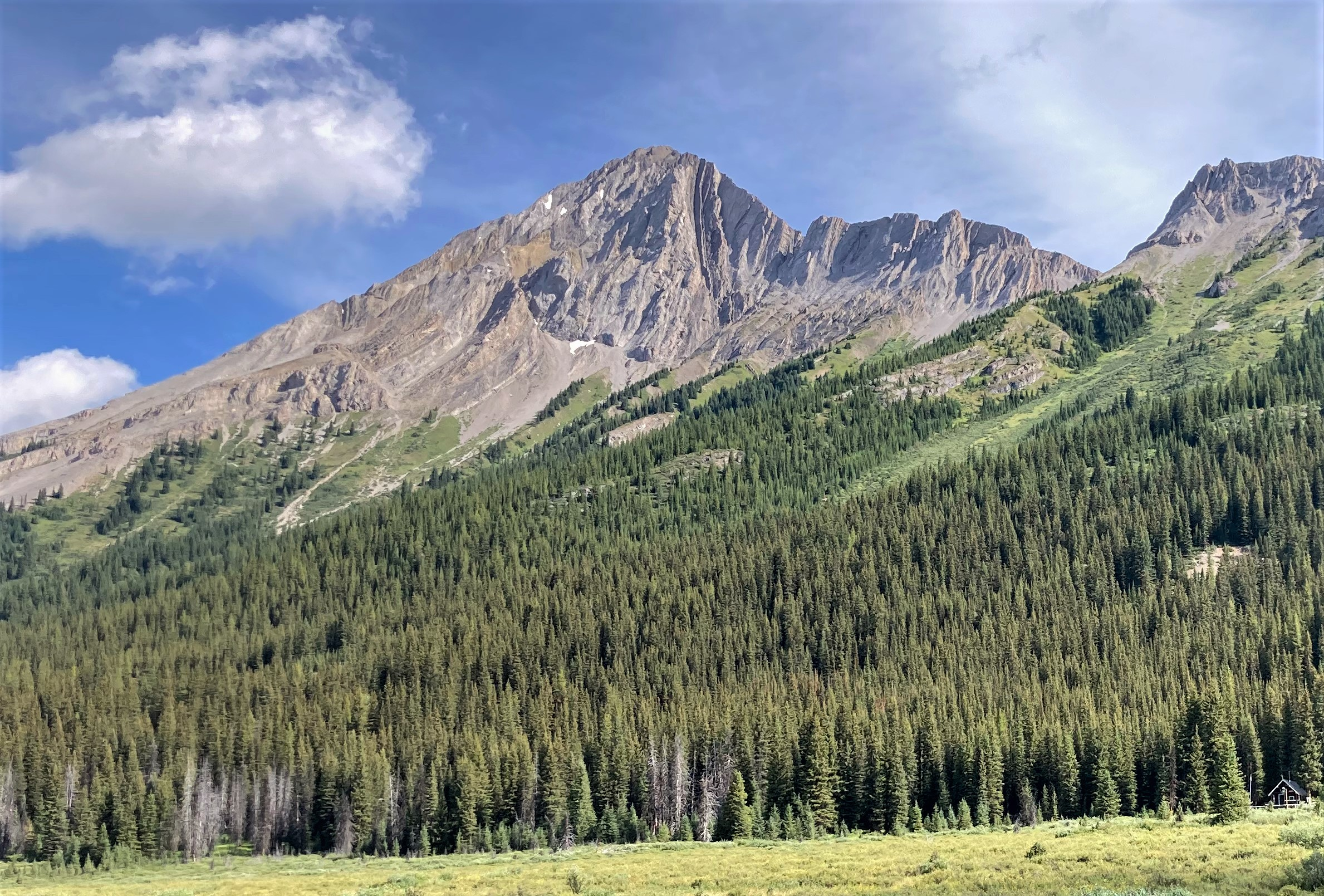
Mount Mercer, south aspect

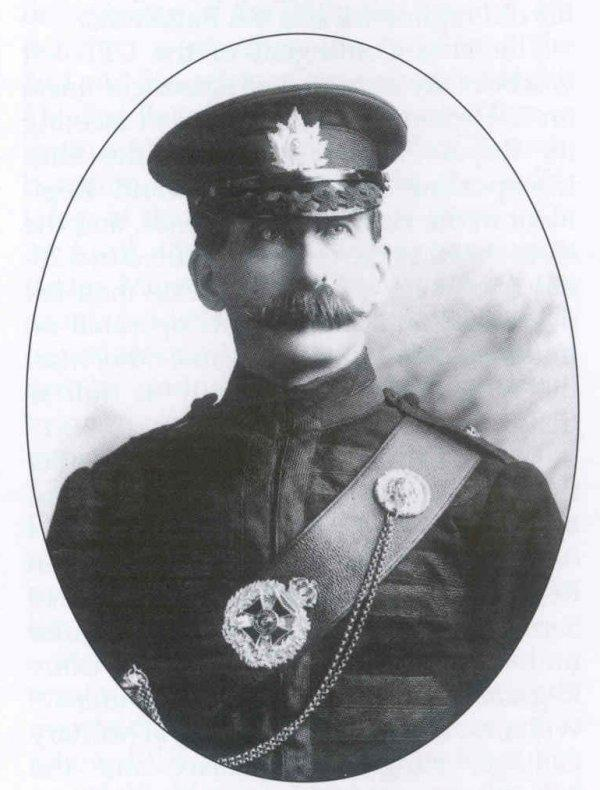
Malcolm Mercer

== See also ==
- Geography of Alberta
- Geology of Alberta
