= Hill 62 Memorial =

Canadian war memorial

Canadian Hill 62 (Sanctuary Wood) Memorial
- Canada
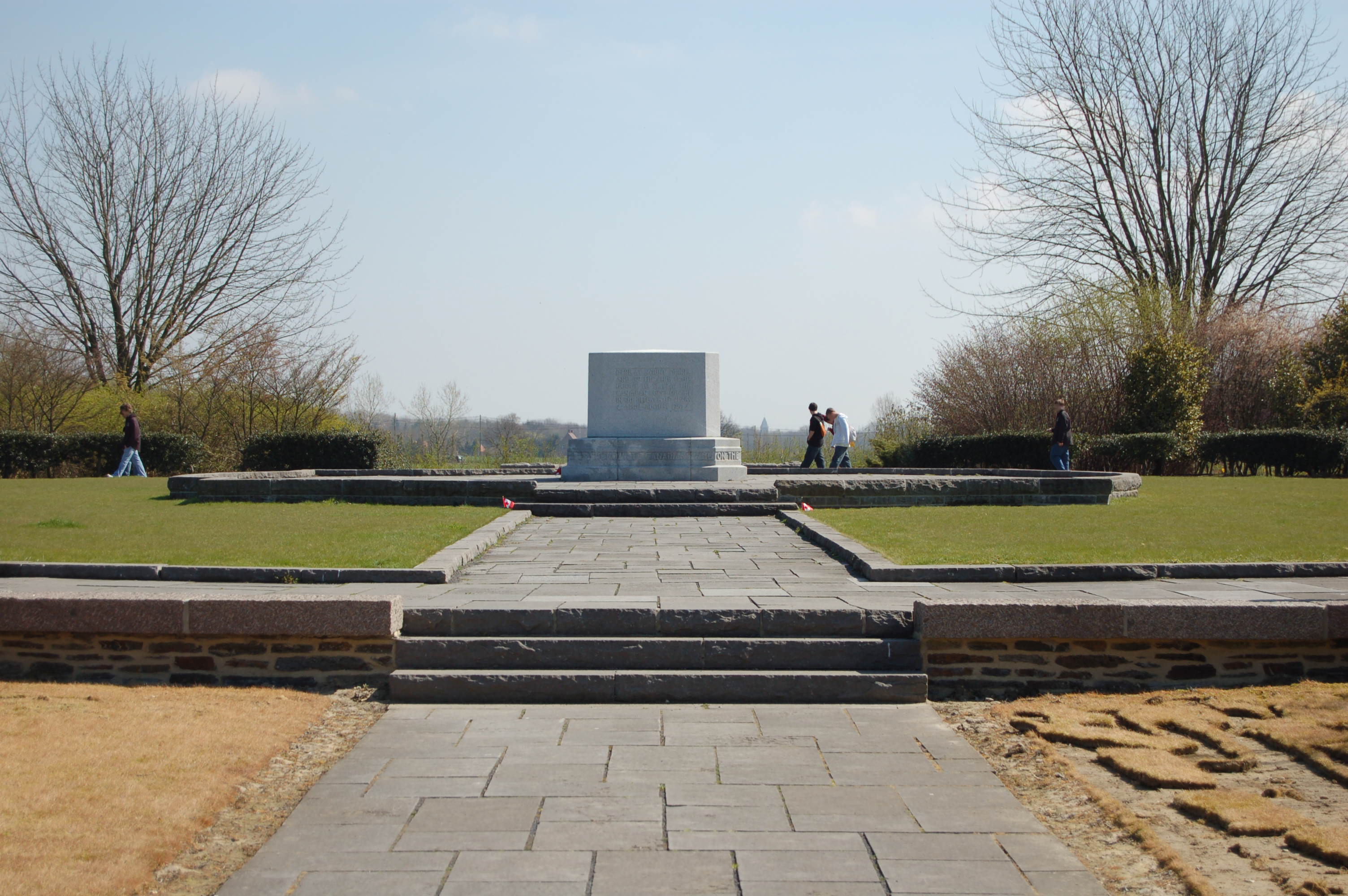
- Hill 62 (Sanctuary Wood) Memorial
- For the Canadian participation in the Defence of Ypres between April and August 1916 and commemoration of the Canadian dead of that period.
- Location: 50°50′5″N 2°56′48″E near Ypres, Belgium
- Here at Mount Sorrel and on the line from Hooge to St. Eloi the Canadian Corps fought in the defence of Ypres April–August 1916

The Canadian Hill 62 (Sanctuary Wood) Memorial is a war memorial that commemorates the actions of the Canadian Corps in defending the southern stretches of the Ypres Salient between April and August 1916 including actions in battle at the St Eloi Craters, Hill 62, Mount Sorrel and Sanctuary Wood. These battles marked the first occasion in which Canadian divisions engaged in planned offensive operations during World War I. In those actions the Canadians reconquered vital high-ground positions that denied the Germans a commanding view of the town of Ypres itself.

== Historical Background ==
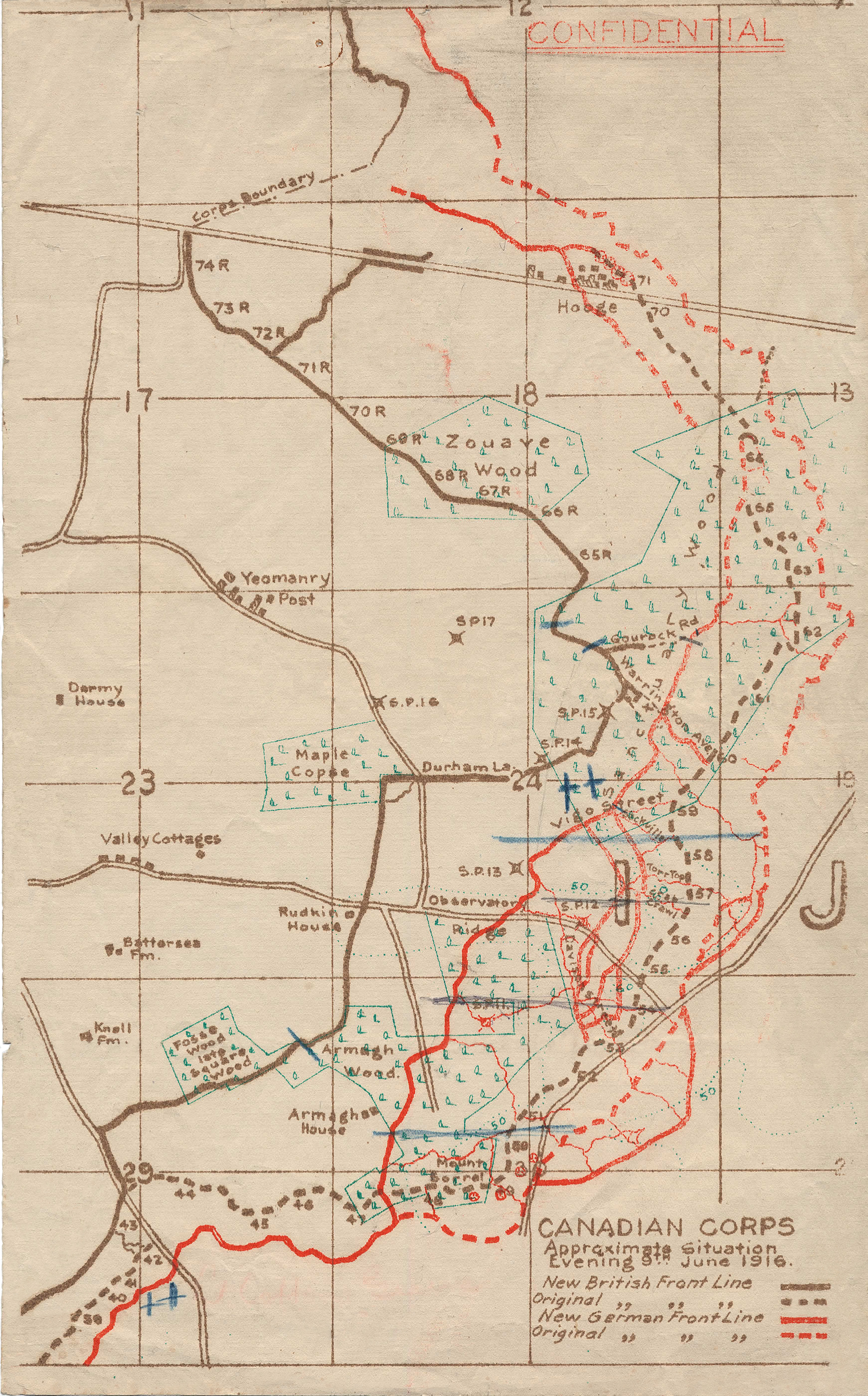
Trench map showing the trench lines following the initial German attack

=== Actions of St Eloi Craters ===
On April 3, 1916, the Canadian Corps, including the newly formed and inexperienced 2nd and 3rd Canadian Divisions, was dispatched to a stretch of the front south of Ypres at the St. Eloi Craters. There they found themselves in a wasteland, in places waist-deep in water and mud, with six large mine craters and few trench defences under the full view of the German forces on higher ground. Three days later, the Germans launched a series of attacks that went on for ten days in miserable rainy weather during which their weak defensive positions, poor understanding of the situation, poor communication and poor leadership led to the Canadians being forced off several key positions despite several attempts at counter-attack. In 13 days of fighting at St. Eloi some 1,375 Canadians became casualties including some men who were felled by their own artillery fire due to the poor understanding of battlefield. This proved to be the Canadians' only significant, lasting defeat of the war.

=== Battles of Mount Sorrel, Hill 62, and Sanctuary Wood ===
After their withdrawal from the St. Eloi sector, the Canadians were redeployed into frontline trenches about 4 kilometres (2.5 mi) to the northeast, at the opposite end of the same ridgeline, where they soon were engaged in the Battles of Mount Sorrel, Hill 62, and Sanctuary Wood. Here, the Allies still held the heights atop Mount Sorrel, Hill 61 and Hill 62. Again, shortly after inheriting their trenches, from June 2 to 6 the Germans mounted an attack aimed to knock the 3rd Division out of their positions on the high ground. In the fiercest bombardment that had been experienced by Canadian troops to that point in the war, entire sections of trench were obliterated and the soldiers defending them annihilated, with many being hopelessly buried alive. As men were literally blown from their positions, the 3rd Division fought desperately until overwhelmed by the ensuring enemy infantry advance. The Canadians attempted counter-attacks, but the Germans exploded four mines underneath the Canadian lines and renewed their attack again on June 6 and captured the remaining high ground, most of Sanctuary Wood and even advanced onto the plain beyond.

The newly appointed commander of the Canadian Corps, Lieutenant-General Sir Julian Byng, was determined to win back the high ground on Mount Sorrel and Hill 62 and gave orders for 1st Canadian Division, under the command of Major-General Arthur Currie, to plan and execute the counter-attack. Following a vicious three-day artillery bombardment, the Canadian infantry attacked up the slopes in darkness at 1:30 a.m. June 13 and in the ensuing battle re-took the heights lost between 2 and 6 June. "The first Canadian deliberately planned attack in any force", the British Official History recorded, "had resulted in an unqualified success." However, the cost of the victory was steep; as June 1916 saw the Canadians suffer over 8,400 casualties. The Canadians resecured their positions and held the critical high ground they had retaken until they were withdrawn from the sector to participate at the Battle of the Somme in August.

== Monument ==
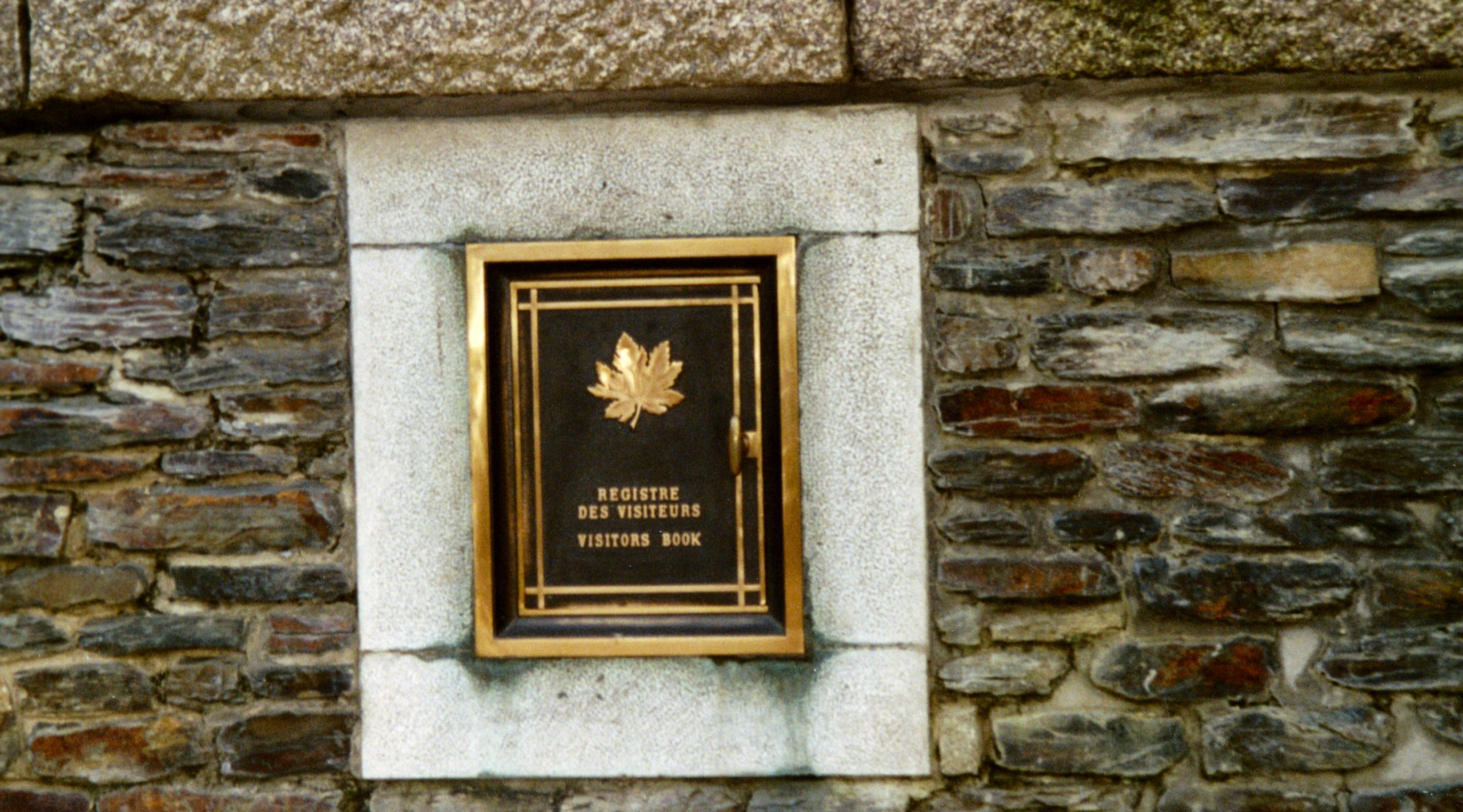
Hill 62 Memorial visitor's book cabinet

=== Site selection ===
At the end of the war, The Imperial War Graves Commission granted Canada eight sites – five in France and three in Belgium – on which to erect memorials. Each site represented a significant Canadian engagement in the war and for this reason it was originally decided that each battlefield would be treated equally and graced with identical monuments. The Canadian Battlefields Memorials Commission was formed in November 1920 and decided a competition would be held to select the design of the memorial that would be used at the eight European sites. In October 1922, the submission of Toronto sculptor and designer Walter Seymour Allward was selected as the winner of the competition, and the submission of Frederick Chapman Clemesha placed second. The commission decided Allward's monumental design would be used at Vimy Ridge in France as it was the most dramatic location. Despite a consideration that Alward's monument at Vimy could stand alone as the sole monument to the Canadian efforts in Europe Clemesha's 'Brooding Soldier' design was selected for the remaining seven sites but was later, for a number of reasons, erected only at St. Julien in Belgium.

The remaining six memorials, to be built on sites at Hill 62 and Passchendaele in Belgium and at Bourlon Wood, Courcelette, Dury and Le Quesnel in France would each received a modest memorial designed under the supervision of architect and advisor to the Battlefield Memorials Commission, Percy Erskine Nobbs. Situated on key points of the battlefield they memorialize, the central feature of the memorials would be a 13-tonne cube-shaped block of white-grey granite quarried near Stanstead Quebec. The blocks are essentially identical, carved with wreathes on two opposing sides and inscribed with the phrase "Honour to the Canadians who on the fields of Flanders and France fought in the cause of the Allies with sacrifice and devotion" around the base. Though uniform in design, they are differentiated in the brief English and French descriptions of the battle they commemorate inscribed on their sides and the small parks that surround the memorial blocks, which vary in shape and layout.

At the encouragement of General Sir Arthur Currie, the Canadian Battlefields Memorials Commission competition jury that chose Walter Allward's monument design had originally envisioned Alward's edifice being built atop Hill 62 as Currie believed it had been the site of the Canadian Corps first offensive success during the war. When they appeared before the committee, Parkdale MP Herbert Mowat and Victoria Cross recipient Cy Peck expressed a preference for a distinct memorial at Vimy Ridge. Ultimately, Hill 62 received the standard granite block memorial instead of Alward's towering white pylons.

=== Location and design ===
The Hill 62 (Sanctuary Wood) Memorial site is on the top of a hill known to British Great War soldiers as Torr Top, the top of which stands 62 metres above sea level (hence its other name Hill 62) and about 30 metres around the surrounding plateau, which offers a clear and commanding view of the surrounding area including Ypres, just over 3 kilometres (1.9 mi) away. The vantage point clearly illustrates the strategic significance of the position and thereby the importance of the Canadian Corps's accomplishment in wresting it and the territories surrounding it from the German Army in June 1916. The entrance to the memorial is found at the end of the Canadalaan (Canada Lane) which runs south from the N8/Meenseweg road running from Ypres to Menen.

The memorial park is made up of a beautiful series of three terraced gardens leading up the hillside to the manicured lawns at the summit where the grey granite block monument sits in a grassed circle on a low flagstone terrace.

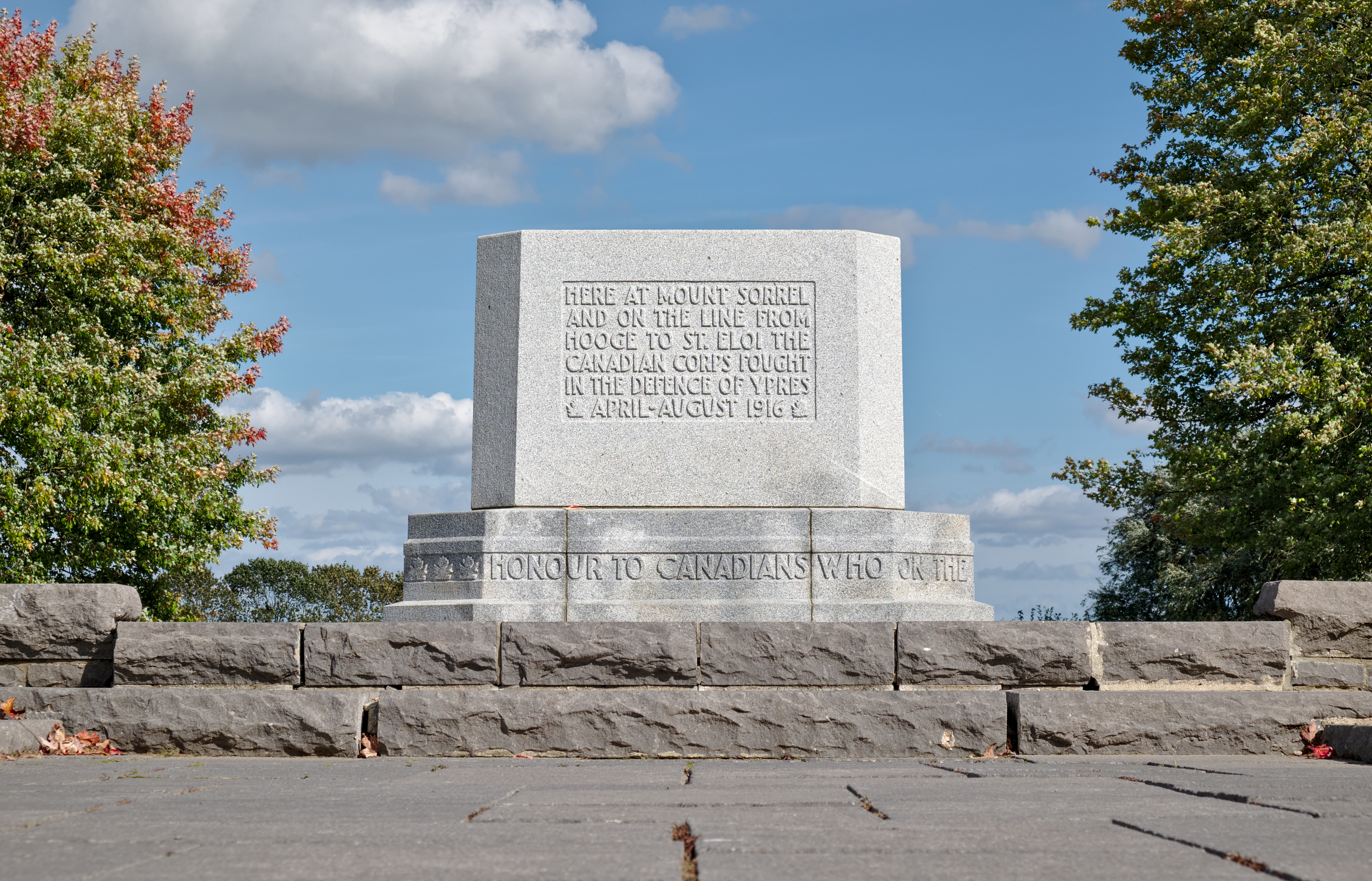
Close-up of the central granite block monument, showing the English inscription

The English inscription on the side of the central granite memorial block reads:

Here at Mount Sorrel and on the line from Hooge to St. Eloi the Canadian Corps fought in the defence of Ypres April–August 1916

The inscription is factually incorrect as the memorial sits on Hill 62, also known as Torr Top. Mount Sorrel is a different hill, which is about 850 metres south-southeast of the memorial and can be seen from the memorial park.

== See also ==
- Sanctuary Wood Museum Hill 62
