= 27th Division (German Empire) =

27th Division (27. Division); from August 2, 1914, 27th Infantry Division (27. Infanterie-Division)
- Active: 1871-1919
- Country: Kingdom of Württemberg; German Empire
- Branch: Army
- Type: Infantry (in peacetime included cavalry)
- Size: Approx. 15,000
- Part of: XIII. Army Corps (XIII. Armeekorps)
- Garrison/HQ: Ulm
- Engagements: World War I: Great Retreat, Battle of the Somme, Arras, German spring offensive, Hundred Days Offensive, Meuse-Argonne Offensive

The 27th Division (27. Division), formally the 27th Division (2nd Royal Württemberg) (27. Division (2. Königlich Württembergische)), was a unit of the Prussian/German Army. It was headquartered in Ulm in the eastern part of the Kingdom of Württemberg. The division was subordinated in peacetime to the XIII (Royal Württemberg) Corps (XIII. (Königlich Württembergisches) Armeekorps). The division was disbanded in 1919 during the demobilization of the German Army after World War I. The division was raised and recruited in the Kingdom of Württemberg. Among the most famous soldiers to serve in the division was Erwin Rommel (later Generalfeldmarschall) who fought as a lieutenant with the division on the Western Front before being transferred to the Württemberg mountain battalion.

== Evolution of the 27th Division ==
The 27th Division was formed in 1817 as Württemberg's 2nd Infantry Division. It was merged with Württemberg's 1st Infantry Division on July 27, 1849, to form Württemberg's Infantry Division and was dissolved in 1868. The division was reestablished after the Franco-Prussian War on December 18, 1871, as the 27th Division (2nd Royal Württemberg), taking its new numbering as part of the Prussian Army structure.

== Combat chronicle ==
Although the 27th Division was not formed until 1871, its predecessors saw action in the Austro-Prussian War of 1866 against Prussia and in the Franco-Prussian War of 1870–71 on the side of Prussia against France. The Württemberg Infantry Division saw action in the Main campaign in 1866. During the Franco-Prussian War, the Württemberg Field Division fought at the battles of Wœrth and Sedan, and then participated in the Siege of Paris and the Battle of Villiers (November 30 and December 2, 1870).

During World War I, the division served on the Western Front. In 1914, it fought in the Allied Great Retreat. It fought in the Battle of the Somme in 1916 and the Battle of Arras in 1917. The division served in the 1918 German spring offensive and the subsequent Allied counteroffensives, including the Hundred Days Offensive and the Meuse-Argonne Offensive. Allied intelligence rated the division as one of the very best German divisions and described it as a first class shock unit.

== Pre-World War I organization ==
The organization of the 27th Division in 1914, shortly before the outbreak of World War I, was as follows:

- 53. Kgl. Württembergische Infanterie-Brigade
  - Grenadier-Regiment König Karl (5. Württembergisches) Nr. 123
  - Infanterie-Regiment König Wilhelm I (6. Württembergisches) Nr. 124
- 54. Kgl. Württembergische Infanterie-Brigade
  - Infanterie-Regiment Kaiser Wilhelm, König von Preußen (2. Württembergisches) Nr. 120
  - 9. Württembergisches Infanterie-Regiment Nr. 127
  - 10. Württembergisches Infanterie-Regiment Nr. 180
- 27. Kavallerie-Brigade
  - Ulanen-Regiment König Karl (1. Württembergisches) Nr. 19
  - Ulanen-Regiment König Wilhelm I (2. Württembergisches) Nr. 20
- 27. Kgl. Württembergische Feldartillerie-Brigade
  - Feldartillerie-Regiment König Karl (1. Württembergisches) Nr. 13
  - 3. Württembergisches Feldartillerie-Regiment Nr. 49

== Order of battle on mobilization ==
On mobilization in August 1914, at the beginning of World War I, most divisional cavalry, including brigade headquarters, was withdrawn to form cavalry divisions or split up among divisions as reconnaissance units. Divisions received engineer companies and other support units from their higher headquarters. The 27th Division was renamed the 27th Infantry Division. Its initial wartime organization was as follows:

- 53. Kgl. Württembergische Infanterie-Brigade
  - Grenadier-Regiment König Karl (5. Württembergisches) Nr. 123
  - Infanterie-Regiment König Wilhelm I (6. Württembergisches) Nr. 124
- 54. Kgl. Württembergische Infanterie-Brigade
  - Infanterie-Regiment Kaiser Wilhelm, König von Preußen (2. Württembergisches) Nr. 120
  - 9. Württembergisches Infanterie-Regiment Nr. 127
- Ulanen-Regiment König Karl (1. Württembergisches) Nr. 19
- 27. Kgl. Württembergische Feldartillerie-Brigade
  - Feldartillerie-Regiment König Karl (1. Württembergisches) Nr. 13
  - 3. Württembergisches Feldartillerie-Regiment Nr. 49
- 2.Kompanie/Württembergisches Pionier-Bataillon Nr. 13
- 3.Kompanie/Württembergisches Pionier-Bataillon Nr. 13

== Late World War I organization ==
Divisions underwent many changes during the war, with regiments moving from division to division, and some being destroyed and rebuilt. During the war, most divisions became triangular - one infantry brigade with three infantry regiments rather than two infantry brigades of two regiments (a "square division"). An artillery commander replaced the artillery brigade headquarters, the cavalry was further reduced, the engineer contingent was increased, and a divisional signals command was created. The 27th Infantry Division's order of battle on March 20, 1918, was as follows:

- 53. Infanterie-Brigade:
  - Infanterie-Regiment Kaiser Wilhelm, König von Preußen (2. Württembergisches) Nr. 120
  - Grenadier-Regiment König Karl (5. Württembergisches) Nr. 123
  - Infanterie-Regiment König Wilhelm I (6. Württembergisches) Nr. 124
  - Maschinengewehr-Scharfschützen-Abteilung Nr. 53
- 5. Eskadron/Ulanen-Regiment König Karl (1. Württembergisches) Nr. 19
- Artillerie-Kommandeur 27:
  - Feldartillerie-Regiment König Karl (1. Württembergisches) Nr. 13
  - II./Hohenzollernsches Fußartillerie-Regiment Nr. 13
- Pionier-Bataillon Nr. 13
  - 2.Kompanie/Württembergisches Pionier-Bataillon Nr. 13
  - 3.Kompanie/Württembergisches Pionier-Bataillon Nr. 13
  - Minenwerfer-Kompanie Nr. 27
- Divisions-Nachrichten-Kommandeur 27
