= Sanctuary Wood Museum Hill 62 =

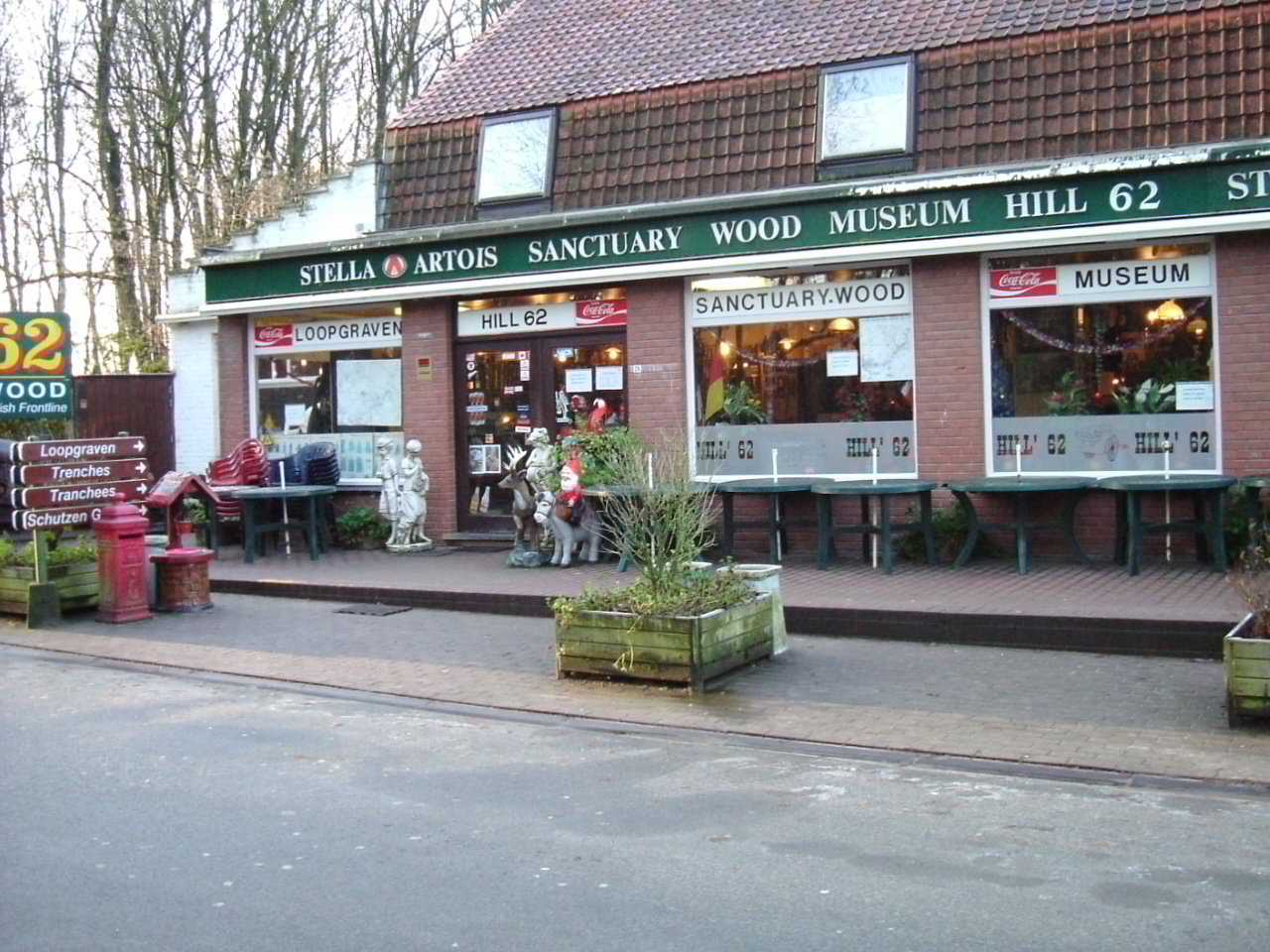
- Sanctuary Wood Museum, Hill 62

- Sanctuary Wood Museum, Hill 62
- Location: near Ypres, West Flanders, Belgium
- Coordinates: 50.836°N 2.946°E
- Type: Military Museum
- Collection size: World War I 3-dimensional photographs, weapons, uniforms and bombs, British trench lines
- Owner: Jacques Schier
- Parking: On site
- Website: Museum Hill 62 Sanctuary Wood

The Sanctuary Wood Museum Hill 62, 3 km (1.9 mi) east of Ypres, Belgium is a private museum located in the neighborhood of the Canadian Hill 62 Memorial and the Sanctuary Wood Cemetery.

The museum was owned by Jacques Schier, the grandson of the farmer who founded the museum and owned the site of the museum since before World War I and left it as he had founded it. He was known as 'Fat Jacques' to generations of visitors. The museum has a collection of World War I items, including a rare collection of 3-dimensional photographs, weapons, uniforms and bombs. A preserved section of the British trench lines is located behind the museum.

The museum also has a small bar, café and gift shop.

== Image Gallery ==
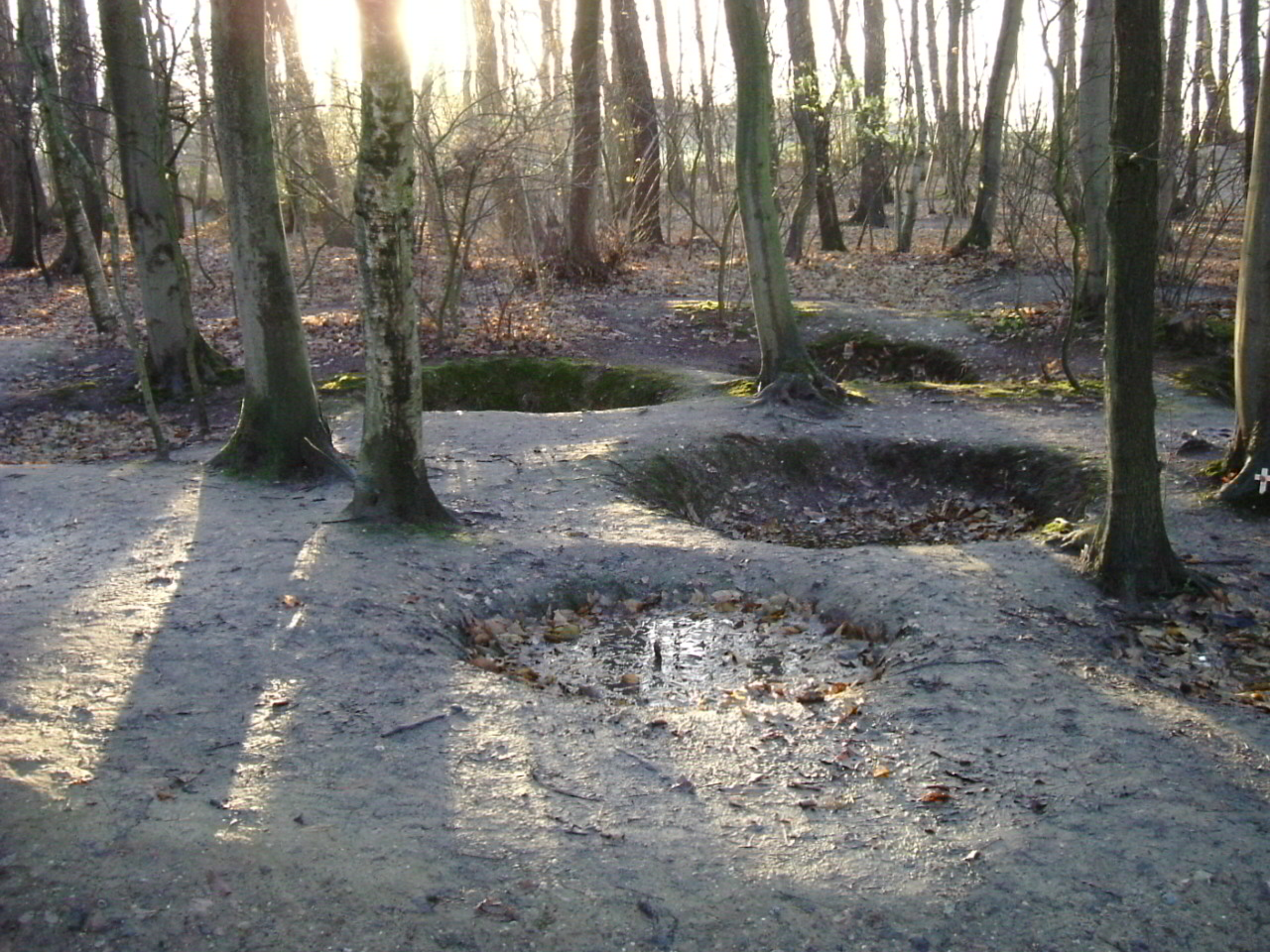
Hill 62 Shell Craters

Hill 62 Trenches

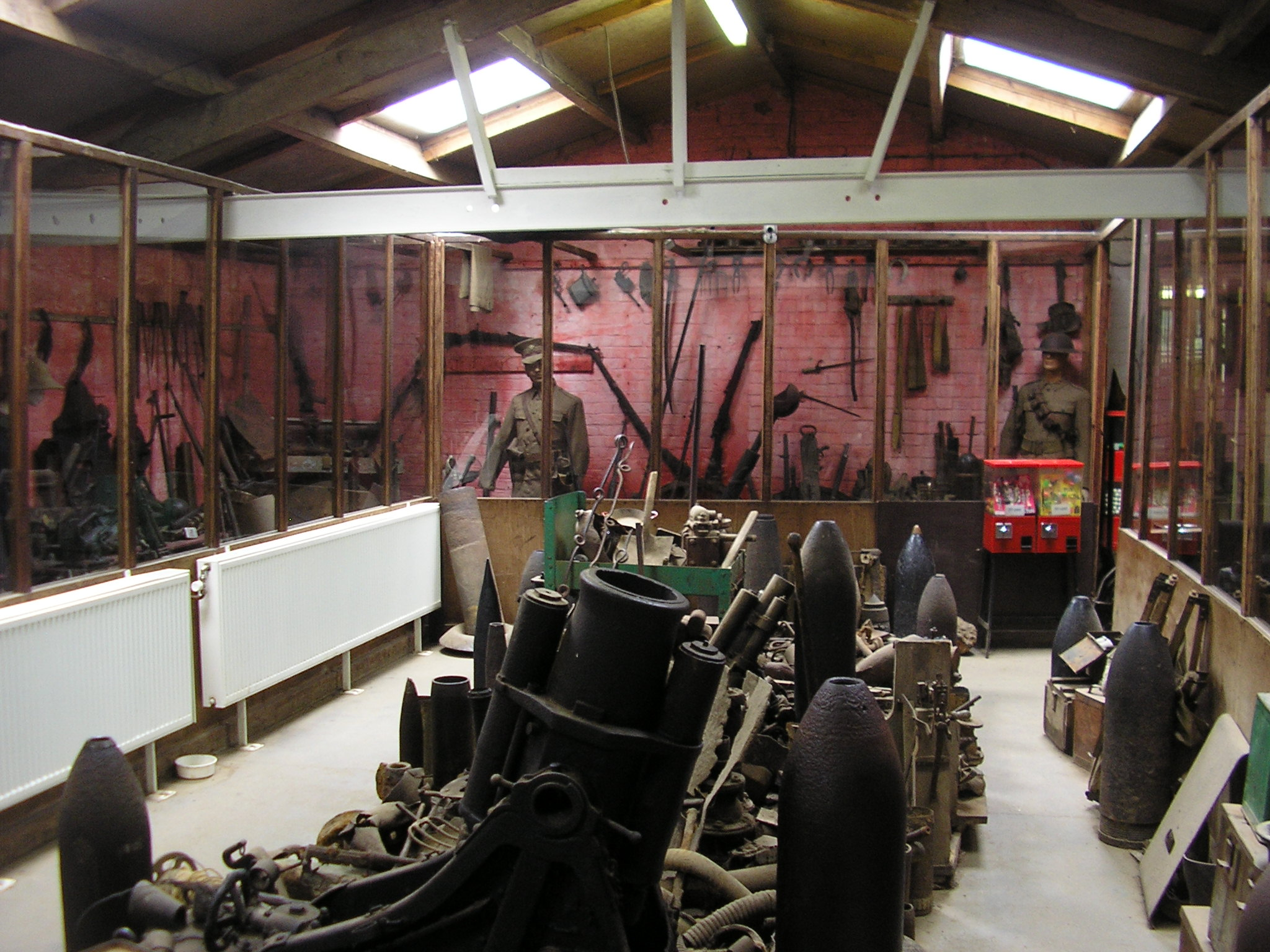
Shell casings and weapons inside the museum

== See also ==
- Battle of Hill 60
- Hill 62 Memorial
- Battle of Passchendaele
- Tyne Cot Memorial
