= Kanalkampf =

1940 Luftwaffe air raids over the English Channel against the Royal Air Force

- Part of the Battle of Britain
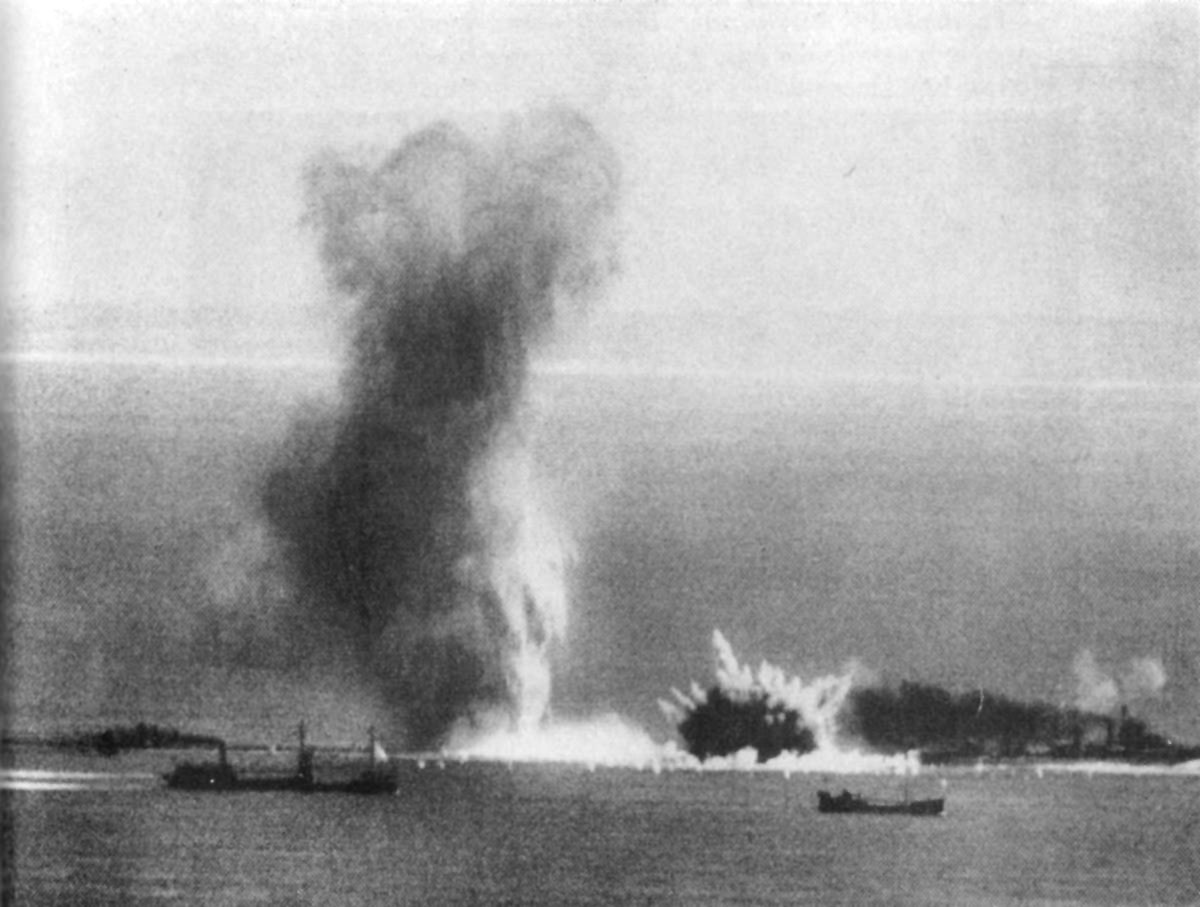
- A British convoy under air attack, 14 July 1940
Date	4 July – 11 August 1940
Location	Southern England and the English Channel 50°N 02°W
Result	See Analysis section

Belligerents
United Kingdom; emigrés, volunteers; Naval support: Netherlands; Norway; Canada; Poland; Belgium	Germany

Commanders and leaders
Hugh Dowding; Keith Park; Trafford Leigh-Mallory	Hermann Göring; Albert Kesselring; Hugo Sperrle; Wolfram von Richthofen; Alfred Saalwächter

Units involved
Fighter Command: 11 Group; 10 Group	Luftwaffe: Luftflotte 2; Luftflotte 3

Casualties and losses
RAF: 115 fighters destroyed; 42 fighters damaged; 71 pilots killed; 19 pilots wounded; 4 pilots missing; Royal Navy: 35 merchant ships sunk; 7 fishing vessels; 4 destroyers; other naval vessels; c. 176 sailors killed; c. 300 casualties	Luftwaffe: 80 fighters destroyed; 36 fighters damaged; 22 dive bombers destroyed; 22 dive bombers damaged; 100 medium bombers destroyed; 33 medium bombers damaged; 13 naval aircraft destroyed; 1 naval aircraft damaged; 201 airmen killed; 75 airmen wounded; 277 missing; 16 airmen prisoner of war; Kriegsmarine: c. 4
- Location within English Channel

The Kanalkampf (Channel Battle) was the German term for air operations by the Luftwaffe against the Royal Air Force (RAF) over the English Channel in July 1940, beginning the Battle of Britain during the Second World War. By 25 June, the Allies had been defeated in Western Europe and Scandinavia. Britain had rejected peace overtures and on 16 July, Adolf Hitler issued Directive 16 to the Wehrmacht (German armed forces), ordering preparations for an invasion of Britain, under the codename Unternehmen Seelöwe (Operation Sea Lion).

The Germans needed air superiority over southern England for the invasion; the Luftwaffe was to destroy the RAF and protect the cross-channel invasion from the Royal Navy. To commence the destruction of RAF Fighter Command, the Luftwaffe attacked convoys in the Channel. British and German writers and historians acknowledge that air battles were fought over the Channel between the Battle of France and Britain; systematic German attacks against British coastal targets and convoys began on 4 July. During the Kanalkampf, the Luftwaffe received modest support from shore artillery and the Schnellboote (S-boats, E-Boats to the British) of the German Navy (Kriegsmarine). Historians differ somewhat about the dates of the Battle of Britain and British histories usually treat 10 July as the beginning.

Fighter Command could not guarantee the defence of the convoys; the Germans sank several British and neutral ships and shot down a considerable number of British fighters. The Royal Navy was forced to suspend the sailing of large convoys in Channel waters and close it to ocean-going vessels until more protection could be arranged, which took several weeks. On 1 August, Hitler issued Directive 17, extending Luftwaffe operations to the British mainland and RAF-related targets. On 13 August (Adlertag, Eagle Day) the main air offensive against the RAF began. The Kanalkampf had drawn out Fighter Command as intended and convoy attacks continued for several more days. Both sides had suffered losses but the Luftwaffe had failed to defeat on Fighter Command; the Luftwaffe had yet to gain air superiority for Operation Sea Lion.

The historian Williamson Murray (1983) regarded the Channel battles as inconclusive; Peter Smith (2007) wrote that the battles could be described as a German victory of sorts. In 2000, Stephen Bungay wrote that in early August the Channel was German by day but that fact did not threaten Fighter Command. Bungay wrote that the Luftwaffe had to advance well beyond the Channel to win an aerial campaign and that Hugo Sperrle, the commander of Luftflotte 3, was already alarmed at German losses. Albert Kesselring, the Luftflotte 2 commander, could ill-afford losses at the rate suffered in July 1940 either.

== Background ==
=== Fall of France ===
On 2 July 1940, in the aftermath of the French surrender, Adolf Hitler decided that an invasion of Britain could only begin after achieving air superiority. On 12 July he outlined his reasoning: aerial domination over the invasion area and its sea approaches was necessary to compensate for the weakness of the Kriegsmarine. Hitler issued a directive on 16 July, ordering the Luftwaffe to prevent all air attacks on the invasion force, destroy British coast defences at the landing points and break the resistance of the British army. The campaign did not start against the RAF until August. In the intervening period, the Luftwaffe undertook its third big operational move in two months. The first had seen it push forward its Air Fleets into the Low Countries and the second into southern France. Now it was expanded into northern France and Belgium, along the English Channel coast. It took time to establish the signal system in France owing to a shortage of trained staff officers while the units replenished after losses through the Ergänzungsverbände (supplemental formations).

The Luftwaffe and army had to repair the French and Belgian infrastructure damaged during the Battle of France. The army rebuilt bridges to supply forward bases and the Luftwaffe the former Allied air bases. This often meant short-range dive bombers and fighters were sent to forward airfields which were urgently in need of electricity and running water for personnel. Upon the French surrender the Luftwaffe supply system was breaking down. On 8 July only 20 of the 84 railway tanks with aviation fuel had reached the main depot at Le Mans. The Transportgruppen (transport groups) of supply aircraft could not cope and barely kept their own units running. Preparations continued at a glacial pace, since the men responsible for the organisation of German air power and its efficient transfer to the Channel, were enjoying the fruits of their new assignments in Paris. Senior staff members were distracted by victory parades and promotions, including Göring who was promoted to Reichsmarschall. During the Kanalkampf the Germans assembled powerful air forces to attack convoys in the Channel but it took about forty days after the French capitulation for the Luftwaffe to begin its assault on the Britain.

=== German strategy ===
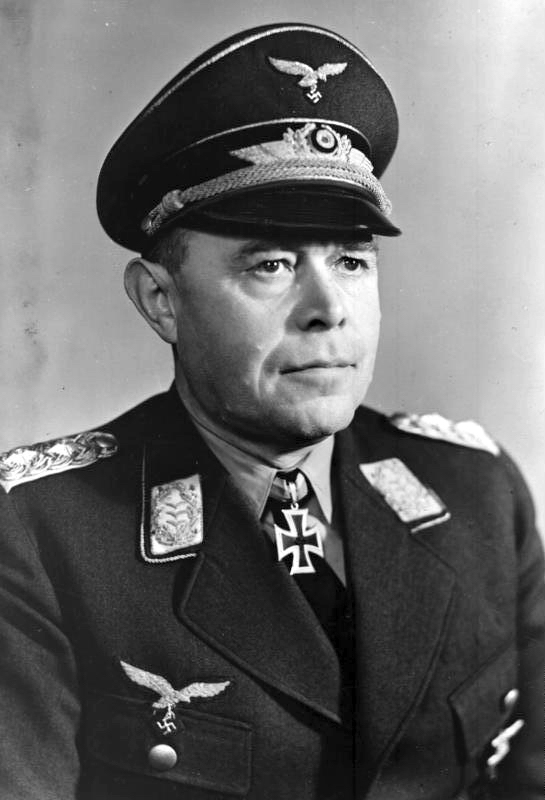
Albert Kesselring, commander of Luftflotte 2

Dispersion of effort was contrary to the German concept of Schwerpunktprinzip (concentration principle) and the Luftwaffe did not operate over Britain in force until after the Armistice of 22 June 1940. When German bomber crews flew over Britain they did so at night; sorties were recorded in May and June 1940. When Britain rejected Hitler's demands, the Luftwaffe undertook preparations to neutralise the country and end the war. Luftflotte 2 (Air Feet 2) and Luftflotte 3 (Air Feet 3) were transferred to France and Belgium. In June and July, sporadic attacks were carried out at night, inland and along the east and southern coasts to keep civilians awake and to damage morale. The attacks were ill-directed and German intentions were not clear to the British.

Night operations gave the Luftwaffe experience in using night navigation equipment, like the Knickebein (crooked leg) night-bombing guidance system. By taking bearings and cross-bearings in the Battle of the Beams on German medium-wave transmitters, aircraft could find their position sufficiently accurately to make the discovery of landmarks easy. On the night of 6/7 June, the first Luftwaffe bomb to fall on Greater London was dropped on at Addington and small raids continued through the month. Thirteen airfields, sixteen factories and fourteen ports were attacked to little effect. Flying at low altitudes, the German bombers could be illuminated by searchlights. Two were shot down in June by anti-aircraft guns. The bombers began to fly higher to escape anti-aircraft fire.

Operations against British sea communications did not appeal to Reichsmarschall Hermann Göring, in his view, the Luftwaffe was not prepared for naval warfare and this strategy was tantamount to blockade, which was put in effect against Britain from 18 July. The blockade required the co-operation of the Luftwaffe with the Kriegsmarine (German navy) but Göring ensured air assistance was not forthcoming. Göring loathed the navy and its Commander-in-Chief Großadmiral Erich Raeder. In Göring's eyes, Raeder and the navy represented the bourgeois clique of German society the National Socialist revolution had pledged to eliminate. The Reichsmarschall consistently refused to accept the navy's calls for assistance in the war against the Royal Navy and British commerce throughout the conflict. All of the directives issued to the Luftwaffe by the Oberkommando der Luftwaffe (OKL—High Command of the Air Force) or Oberkommando der Wehrmacht (OKW—Supreme High Command of the Armed Forces), stated that sea attacks on warships and shipping must take second place to "military objectives"; the OKW did not alter this view until February 1941.

Göring and OKL intended to strike at the RAF and establish air superiority, if not air supremacy, made clear in Göring's 30 June directive. Göring hoped that a victory in the air battle would preclude an invasion of Britain by persuading the Churchill Government to negotiate peace with Germany. This was most evident during a conference in Berlin on 31 July when Hitler outlined Operation Sea Lion and its objectives. No Luftwaffe representative was present and Göring ignored summonses by Hitler to conferences aimed and inter-service co-operation. While the army and navy made tentative steps towards an amphibious assault, OKL was engaged in an internal debate about which targets should be attacked to attain control of the air as quickly as possible. Though Göring's directive mentioned cutting off British supplies, he referred to shipping. On 11 July, the Chief of the Luftwaffe General Staff, Hans Jeschonnek, ordered that coastal shipping should be attacked as a prelude to the main battle against the RAF and its infrastructure. The Luftflotte commanders, Hugo Sperrle and Albert Kesselring, had already begun coastal operations as the indecision of OKL had left them with little else to do.

OKL decided to pursue coastal targets because these were easier to find than targets inland. The Royal Air Force (RAF) would suffer a higher degree of attrition in comparison to fighting over land, since they would be fighting over an area which would be strongly contested by the bulk of its opponent. RAF pilots that abandoned their aircraft over water would face the same peril as their German counterparts; the RAF lacked an air-sea rescue service, unlike the Luftwaffe. It was also desirable to eliminate the English Channel as a supply route to Greater London via the Thames Estuary. Shipping could travel north of Scotland but it would slow the supply of materials for the British war effort. Dowding preferred the navy to re-route its convoys to ease the burden on his forces. German intentions were exploitative at first but evolved into dual purpose operations—to close the Channel to shipping and draw Fighter Command into combat.

Luftflotte 2 and Luftflotte 3 sent small numbers of bombers against British sea communications, attacking ships and laying mines. In July, the Luftwaffe transferred air units to the European coast from Hamburg to Brest in Brittany on the French Atlantic coast. By 17 July, the two air fleets had reached their intended strength for operations against southern England and the Midlands, with 1,200 medium bombers, 280 dive-bombers, 760 single-engine fighters, 220 twin-engine fighters, 50 long-range reconnaissance aircraft (90 of the medium bombers could fly bomber-reconnaissance sorties against shipping and ports) and 90 short-range reconnaissance aircraft. Luftflotte 5 in Norway, with 130 medium bombers, 30 twin-engine fighters and 30 long-range reconnaissance aircraft, exerted an indirect effect on the Kanalkampf, by making the RAF keep fighters in the north.

=== Air Ministry and Admiralty ===
RAF and Luftwaffe bases, group and Luftflotte boundaries, British radar coverage and range of Luftwaffe Bf 109 fighters

Relations between the Air Ministry, War Office and the Admiralty had been strained since the establishment of the RAF on 1 April 1918. In the early 1920s, the three services competed for resources, influence and the right of the RAF to exist. The War Office and the Navy tried to abolish the RAF and regain control of army and naval aviation. By 1940, service rivalry had diminished with the return of the Fleet Air Arm to Navy control but the Air Ministry remained suspicious of the intentions of the Army. Fighter Command cooperated with the Navy during the Battle of Dunkirk when the RAF provided fighter cover for the embarkation of the British Expeditionary Force (BEF), which was costly for both services. By 1 June, the RAF reduced its effort to conserve its fighters; a minesweeper, a transport and three destroyers were sunk and two destroyers were damaged in its absence.

The lack of air cover was not uncommon and the RAF believed itself to be more successful in battle, over-claiming German losses by 4:1. Of the 156 German aircraft lost in the west, about 35 were shot down by fire from naval vessels leaving 102, aside from other causes, likely to have been shot down by the RAF against 106 British losses. Co-operation was hindered by Fighter Command retaining rigid control of its units. The Admiralty complained that RAF methods did not permit direct contact by RAF operational staff liaising with the naval command. Time was lost and the fluidity of aerial warfare meant that RAF aircraft came into action at the wrong time or place, often in numbers too small to defend the evacuation ships.

Vice Admiral Max Horton, the Commander-in-Chief, Dover, was responsible for organising the evacuation (Operation Dynamo) and asked to meet Dowding in late June, to prevent the operational difficulties occurring again. Horton was told to put his complaints on paper and send them to Dowding, with a copy to the Air Ministry and they never met. It was felt by the Admiralty that the RAF was fighting a separate war, with little consideration given to joint operations. The protection of shipping was controversial in the RAF, since it required a substantial commitment of fighters. On average the twelve convoys passing through the Channel waters each day needed cover every day and roughly one-third were attacked. It became an immediate burden to 11 Group (Air Officer Commanding [AOC] Keith Park) which was responsible for defending south-east England. The employment of convoys from the Suffolk coast to Lyme Bay negated the value of using the sea as a protective shield because the location gave tactical advantages to the attacker. Coastal radar could give little advance warning of incoming raids since the proximity of Luftwaffe airbases, meant that German aircraft could attack and quickly withdraw, making interception difficult. Standing patrols over convoys could compensate but this exhausted pilots and handed the tactical initiative to the Germans.

Coast and convoy defence had a place in Air Staff fighter defence policy but Dowding had to decide how best to employ Fighter Command to meet the German threat which he did, apparently without consulting the navy. Before the war, Fighter Command had expected attacks by unescorted German bombers upon the eastern Britain. The German occupation of France put the west of England in range of German aircraft. Dowding considered that airfields and factories would be attacked as well as convoys and ports, to draw RAF fighter forces into battle and inflict losses. On 3 July, Dowding asked for convoys to be sent around Scotland, to reduce the burden of convoy escort along the south coast, to preserve Fighter Command for the main battle. Four weeks later the Air Ministry (ostensibly after complaints from the Admiralty) instructed him to meet the Luftwaffe with large formations over shipping on the south coast route. On 9 August Winston Churchill was still asking the navy to use the convoys as bait to lure German bombers; the tactic succeeded but fighting over the sea caused Fighter Command greater losses.

=== Signals intelligence ===
The quantity of Luftwaffe Enigma messages declined after the Battle of France, when it resumed the use of land lines but at the end of June, decrypts revealed that the Luftwaffe was preparing for operations against Britain from Belgium and Holland and that most bomber Geschwader would be ready by 8 July; photographic reconnaissance (PR) showed runways being extended. Since PR had found no invasion shipping in Channel ports, it was considered likely that preliminary operations were contemplated. After about a month of small night raids, on 10 July the Luftwaffe began bigger daylight attacks on ports, coastal convoys and aircraft factories. Decrypts in late June enabled the Air Ministry Air Intelligence branch (AI) to predict the beginning of the German offensive and decrypts for several months previous had been uncovering the Luftwaffe organisation, order of battle and equipment. The accumulation of information allowed AI and the code breakers at Bletchley Park to glean strategic intelligence from tactical signals being sent in lower-grade codes by Luftwaffe flying units. The British estimate of the number of German bombers was reduced from 2,500 to 1,250 by 6 July (the true number was 1,500–1,700).

Changes in Luftwaffe methods and objectives were communicated via landline but at times it could be inferred from Enigma decrypts that changes were afoot. The code-name Adlertag and references to the period from 9 to 13 August, were uncovered but not its purpose. As the Kanalkampf continued, Enigma gave more notice of targets, timing and the size raids but this was sometimes too late to be useful and Luftwaffe changes at short-notice could negate the information. Tactical information from Enigma was not well co-ordinated with RAF Y-stations (RAF Y), which reported separate to Enigma but RAF Y was able to give warnings of German sightings of coastal convoys and imminent attacks by eavesdropping on and decrypting Luftwaffe wireless transmissions between aircraft and the ground. RAF Y identified airborne bomber units and their bases, occasionally also uncovering the target area, although it was mid-August before this added much to Radio Direction Finding (Radar) reports.

German voice transmissions by radio telephone (R/T) were collected by listening stations around Britain, headquartered at RAF Kingsdown in Kent, by German speaking Women's Auxiliary Air Force (WAAF) and Women's Royal Naval Service (WRNS) and sent to local RAF headquarters and Fighter Command HQ which was the centre of the Dowding system where messages were collated with reports from RDF and the Observer Corps. Voice transmissions could occasionally alert Fighter Command to formations assembling beyond RDF range, giving the height of formations, discriminating between fighters and bombers and hear orders being passed to fighter escorts showing main and secondary attacks, Luftwaffe judgements about RAF intentions, meeting points and courses for return journeys.

=== Coastal and Bomber commands ===
RAF Coastal Command Spitfires and Lockheed Hudsons of the Photographic Reconnaissance Unit flew sorties to Norway and points south to the Spanish border to photograph German-occupied ports, looking for signs of invasion preparations. Nothing was revealed until the second week of August, when accumulations of barges were found and interpreted as an invasion preparation. RAF Bomber Command sent its bombers nightly against the German ports, aircraft industry and against airfields when unable to bomb the primary target. The Blenheims of 2 Group made daylight attacks on airfields occupied by the Luftwaffe. In July ports and shipping were made the priority target but until the ports filled with invasion craft in August, Bomber Command continued to attack industry and Luftwaffe ground facilities. The Germans had 400 airfields available and dispersed aircraft around them, making the bombing ineffectual. The targets were defended by large concentrations of anti-aircraft artillery, making ground strafing too risky. (Note: The Luftwaffe had an anti-aircraft (Fliegerabwehrkanone FlaK) arm to defend army, air and industrial targets. When low-level attacks were tried at Sedan in May 1940, mass casualties were incurred.) The Blenheims were vulnerable to fighter attack and the crews had orders to abandon raids unless there was 7/10ths cloud; by the end of June, 90 per cent of planned sorties were cancelled. The Blenheims and some Fairey Battles, returned from France, began to fly on moonlit nights. In July 1940, Bomber Command lost 72 aircraft on these operations.

=== Fighter Command at night ===
Fighter Command claimed 21 German bombers at night over Britain in June. Seven German aircraft crashed and were credited to night-fighters. British night air defences remained rudimentary until early 1941; there was no specialist night fighter or reliable aircraft interception radar. Coastal radar looked out to sea and when a raider crossed the coast, it became difficult to track. At the beginning of The Blitz in October, the Luftwaffe flew 5,900 sorties and lost 23 aircraft, a 0.4 per cent loss rate. The failures cost Air Officer Commanding (AOC) Hugh Dowding, his job in November 1940.

== Prelude ==
=== Luftwaffe anti-shipping operations ===
Map of the Kent coast

Luftwaffe attacks on shipping were made much easier by the capture of bases in France and the Low Countries; in the North Sea, the Grimsby fishing fleet had been attacked twice in June. Air attacks increased and in July, ship losses off the east coast exceeded those by naval mines. Attacks on minesweepers, escort vessels and anti-invasion patrols rapidly increased and was made worse by a lack of light anti-aircraft guns and the concentration of the air defence effort in the south-east of England, against a possible invasion. The Admiralty reserved the right for ships to fire on aircraft on an apparently attacking course because it had been found that a high volume of prompt, accurate fire could reduce the accuracy of bombing and sometimes shoot down the attacker. Hurried training and lack of experience in aircraft recognition among navy crews led to many RAF aircraft being taken for hostile and fired on, even when escorts for the ships. While demanding close escort, the Admiralty required ships to engage unidentified aircraft within 1,500 yd (1,400 m), a practice the RAF considered irresponsible. More training in aircraft recognition and pilots not flying towards to ships on tracks similar to bombing runs were obvious remedies and with experience, navy gunners made fewer mistakes.

=== Coal convoys ===
British power stations ran on coal from Wales, Northumberland and Yorkshire as did the railways, manufacturing industry and shipbuilding. Coal convoys sailed down the east coast to London Docks or down the west coast then the Bristol Channel, English Channel, the Dover Straits and the Thames Estuary to the docks. Trade convoys along the east coast were FN (northbound) and FS (southbound). The area between the English, French and Netherlands coasts was about 400 mi (640 km) long, 110 mi (180 km) at its widest point and 22 mi (35 km) at its narrowest, between Dover and Calais. The seas were full of shoals, sandbars, shipwrecks and minefields laid by both sides, sometimes forcing ships to sail in line. A Coal East (CE convoy) assembled at Glasgow, joined by ships from South Wales in the Bristol Channel. The ships rounded Land's End into the English Channel; usually the convoy would have an escort of two destroyers and six armed merchant trawlers. Off Falmouth four escorts, usually destroyers of Plymouth Command, joined until relieved by ships from Portland Command relieved in turn by ships from Portsmouth Command off the Isle of Wight. At Dungeness, Dover Command mine-sweeping trawlers took over until the Thames Estuary where they were relieved by Thames Command ships. The Dover Command ships then took over a CW (coal west) convoy for the reciprocal voyage. Coal convoys were slow and in easy range of enemy aircraft flying from France but the south coast ports needed 40,000 long tons (41,000 t) of coal a week and land transport capacity was insufficient.

==== Convoy code-names ====
When using R/T, convoy names like CW 9 were undesirable, being long-winded and liable to problems with reception. Convoys expected to receive air cover were given a code-name (Bread) taken from a list created by the RAF and given by Naval Control of Shipping as convoys were formed. The list was long enough to avoid duplication and the names were re-used, as a convoy was unlikely to need a code name for more than two weeks (often only two or three days). Peewit was used for convoys on 21 July and 11 September, Booty was used for convoys on 25 and 30 July, 11 August, 8 and 21 November. Pilot was used for convoys on 30 July and 4 August. An accurate title to identify a convoy is Convoy CW 9 (Peewit). The code names, including Bacon, Bosom, Totem, Fruit, Table, Minor, Cat, Secure, Agent, Bread, Arena and Topaz could be broadcast to convoys to warn them of air attack but the codes were reserved for the use of the escorts and the Senior Officer Escort.

=== 1–3 July ===
The German occupation of the Channel Islands had begun on 30 June 1940 and on Monday 1 July, early morning mist curtailed operations by Luftflotte 2 and Luftflotte 3 but reconnaissance sorties by the Aufklärungsgruppen took place and two Dornier Do 215s were shot down by British ground defences. A Junkers Ju 88 from 3.(F)/Aufklärungsgruppe 121 was also lost to mechanical failure. Several Blenheims, escorted by Hurricanes of 145 Squadron, reconnoitred Abbeville for no loss. Spitfires of 72 Squadron shot down a Heinkel He 59 seaplane whose crew was rescued by a British cruiser, complaining that they were a Red Cross service and should not have been fired upon. The British issued a warning that aircraft operating near convoys did so at their own risk. A scramble was ordered soon afterwards to protect Convoy Jumbo as it approached Portsmouth; the convoy was attacked by Ju 87s which left before British fighters arrived. Blenheim IF fighters from 235 Squadron claimed a Dornier Do 17 damaged and Spitfires from 64 Squadron engaged and shot down a Do 17 from Kampfgeschwader 77 (KG 77: Bomber Group 77) that was approaching RAF Kenley.

==== Convoy OA 177G ====
Twenty ships of Convoy OA 177G (Outbound Atlantic) departed Southend on 1 July, consisting of local coasters carrying coal to the ports along the coast. Ten big ocean-going ships joined at Plymouth and Falmouth, en route to Gibraltar, by when most of the coasters had entered port. On 2 July, Ju 87 dive-bombers of Sturzkampfgeschwader 2 (StG2, Dive-Bomber Group 2) attacked the convoy and the British troopship Aeneas (10,058 GRT) moving at 7 kn (13 km/h; 8.1 mph), 21 nmi (39 km; 24 mi) south-east of Start Point, Devon was bombed, 21 men were killed and 122 were rescued by the destroyer HMS Witherington, the ship sinking off Portland Bill. StG2 also damaged the British SS Baron Ruthven (3,178 GRT) causing five casualties; a doctor was transferred from a destroyer but two of the wounded died before the ship reached Portsmouth. S-23, a German Schnellboot (Fast Boat, E-boat to the British) out looking for the convoys, was damaged by a mine and sank as it was being towed home. (Note: Bijou (98 GRT) was sunk by air attack at Mistley Quay, near Harwich on 3 July.) To be closer to the coast, Dowding transferred 79 Squadron from Biggin Hill to RAF Hawkinge in place of 245 Squadron, which was sent to RAF Turnhouse in Scotland.

=== 4 July ===
==== Portland ====
In the morning of 4 July, the Luftwaffe attacked Portland harbour. Messerschmitt Bf 110s from V.(Z)./Lehrgeschwader 1 (LG 1: Demonstration Group 1) and two Staffeln (squadrons) of Messerschmitt Bf 109s from I./Jagdgeschwader 1 (JG 1: Fighter Group) (renamed III./Jagdgeschwader 27 -JG 27- the next day) escorted Junkers Ju 87 Stukas of II./Sturzkampfgeschwader 51 (StG 51, renamed II./Sturzkampfgeschwader 1 StG 1, the next day). At 08:15 the Stukas arrived and with no RAF fighters in sight, attacked HMS Foylebank (ex-MV Andrew Weir,5,582 GRT) armed with four twin four-inch high-angle guns, multiple two-pounder Pom-Pom guns and 0.5-inch machine guns. The ship had been sent to Portland on 9 June to protect the harbour. The gunners on Foylebank did not have the time to man their weapons properly and 104 bombs were dropped, many hitting the vessel. Foylebank's tender was hit and sank immediately, 176 sailors being killed or died of wounds. The Stukas sank the tug Silverdial and damaged the merchantmen East Wales (4,358 GRT), William Wilberforce (5,004 GRT) and City of Melbourne (6,630 GRT). (Note: Leading Seaman Jack Foreman Mantle on Foylecastle manned one of the guns unjammed it and opened fire but was mortally wounded by machine gun fire. Captain H. P. Wilson praised Mantle in an after-report to the Commander-in-Chief, Portsmouth and Mantle was awarded the Victoria Cross.) StG 51 lost a Ju 87, shot down by Foylebank gunners, Leutnant Schwarze and his gunner being posted missing and another Stuka was slightly damaged; a Bf 109 was damaged.

==== Convoy OA 178 ====
Convoy OA 178 (Outbound Atlantic) of 14 ocean-going merchantmen and local collier traffic left the Thames Estuary, bound for the west coast and passed Dover safely on 3 July. German radar picked up the convoy and the Luftwaffe was ordered to intercept the ships after attacking Portland. A Junkers Ju 88 reconnaissance aircraft from 1.(F)/123 flew over the Channel and reported that the convoy was south-west of Portland. I./StG 2 from Falaise with 24 Ju 87s, escorted by a Staffel of fighters from I./JG 1. The attack was followed by 23 Ju 87s of III./StG 51 after they had been hastily re-fuelled and bombed up. SS Dallas City (4,952 GRT) was bombed, engulfed in flames and collided with SS Flimston (4,674 GRT) which was also hit; the ships took 15 minutes to disengage, Dallas City sinking later at 50°09' N, 02°01 W, the crew being rescued. Antonio limped into Portland Harbour with Flimston, where the anti-aircraft ship Foylebank was on fire and sinking. The Dutch ship SS Deucalion (1,796 GRT, 27 survivors) sank at 50°11' N, 02°35' W, Kolga (3,526 GRT) and Britsum (5,225 GRT) were sunk and SS Canadian Constructor, was damaged for no Luftwaffe loss.

In the late evening, Hurricanes of 79 Squadron scrambled to defend shipping off Dover being attacked by Dornier Do 17s of Kampfgeschwader 2 (KG 2). Several ships were badly damaged, a freighter was beached to avoid sinking and Bf 109s from II./Jagdgeschwader 51 (JG 51) shot down a Hurricane. Sergeant Henry Cartwright, a flying ace with five victories, was killed, for one Do 17 damaged. The day was a success for the Luftwaffe, the attack on Portland inflicting the worst ever loss of life on British military personnel based in Britain. Churchill was perturbed and submitted an "Action This Day" memo to the Admiralty,

Could you let me know on one sheet of paper what arrangements you are making about the Channel Convoys now that the Germans are all along the Channel coast? The attacks yesterday both from the air and by E-boats, were very serious, and I should like to be assured this morning that the situation is in hand and the Air is contributing effectively.

Horton regarded the episode as a disgrace and the Admiralty complained to the prime minister, who demanded that Fighter Command do more to protect Channel shipping.

=== 5 July ===
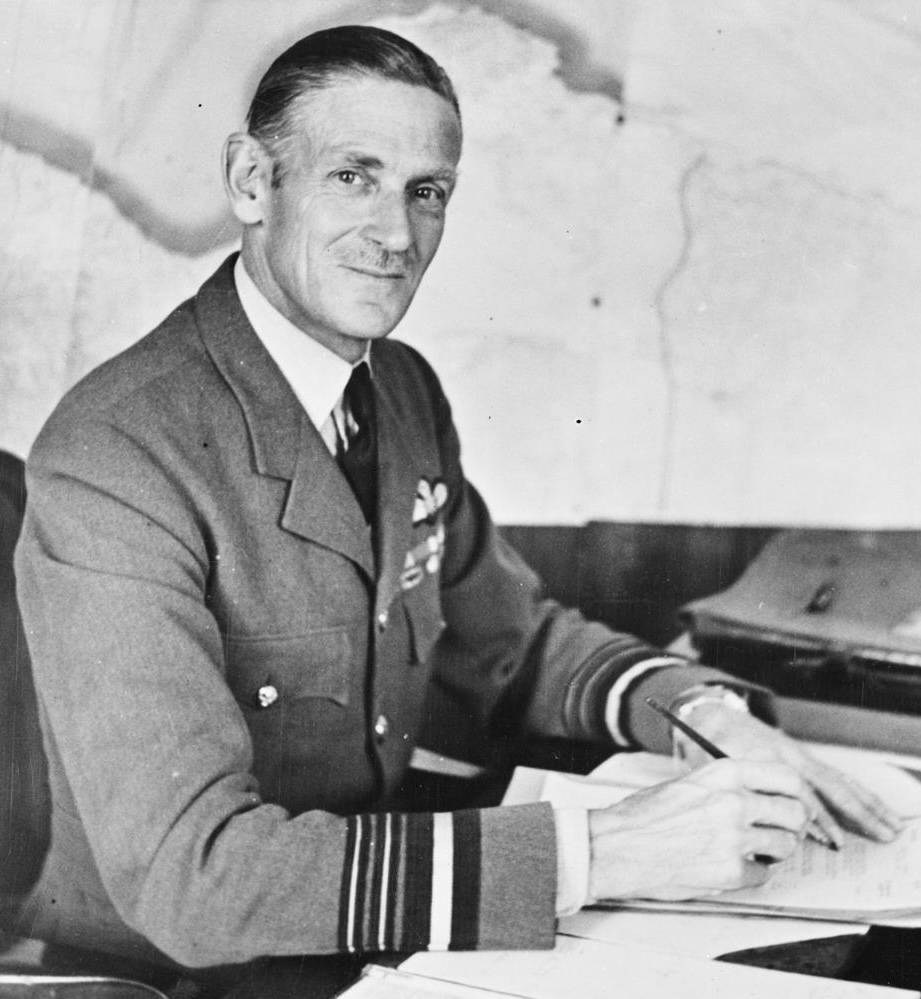
Keith Park, AOC No. 11 Group

The weather was poor over the Channel on 5 July and 65 Squadron shot down an 8. Staffel Heinkel He 111 of Kampfgeschwader 1 (KG 1) over the sea, with the loss of all five crew. Late in the evening, 64 Squadron flew a reconnaissance patrol over Calais and Bf 109s from JG 51 shot down a Spitfire, its pilot being killed and another was damaged for no loss to the German fighters. Evidence grew that the main Luftwaffe attack would fall in the south and as Fighter Command squadrons were rebuilt with pilots from Operational Training Units (OTU), Dowding agreed with Keith Park the commander of 11 Group.

=== 6 July ===
On 6 July, Air Vice-Marshal Trafford Leigh-Mallory (12 Group) to a transfer of some squadrons to bases closer to the coast. The Air Staff expected German attacks from the Cherbourg peninsula and 609 Squadron was moved from RAF Northolt to RAF Middle Wallop on Salisbury Plain; 87 Squadron moved to Exeter to cover Bristol, Plymouth and the Western Approaches.

=== 7 July ===
Convoy patrols were resumed on 7 July in defence of CW and CE (west- and east-bound) coal convoys along the south coast and 145 Squadron shot down a Do 17P reconnaissance aircraft over the Channel, 43 Squadron shot down another shadowing an east-bound convoy and another Do 17 fell to 601 Squadron later on. Luftwaffe Jagdgeschwader (Fighter Groups) were encouraged to embark upon freie jagd (free hunts) to engage RAF fighters wherever possible, with no bombers to protect. As 54 Squadron prepared to attack a lone He 111, it was "bounced" by Bf 109s; two pilots force-landed and another fighter was damaged, the pilots surviving. At 19:30 Greenwich Mean Time (GMT) as the convoy passed Dover, forty-five Do 17s from I. and II./KG 2 took off from Arras and attacked at 20:15, sinking one ship and damaging three more. The radar stations at Pevensey, Rye and Dover gave good warning of the attack and seven Spitfires from 64 Squadron were ordered up from RAF Kenley, with six more from 65 Squadron at RAF Hornchurch.

The fighters took off too late, could not prevent the attack and 65 Squadron was bounced by 70 Bf 109s from JG 27. Three Spitfires were shot down, all three pilots being killed and two Bf 109s were claimed destroyed (although neither can be identified through Luftwaffe loss records). The fighters of 64 Squadron damaged a Do 17 which crash-landed at Boulogne and another suffered minor damage. Before dark, He 111s bombed Portland Harbour, near-missed SS British Inventor (7,101 GRT), killing one man and hit HMS Mercury, whose crew lost four dead and three wounded. Dowding was now in no doubt that the Luftwaffe was concentrating on ships and harbours and that the seven coastal convoys and deep-sea convoys at sea would be attacked. Dowding regarded convoy escort as wasteful and feared that Fighter Command would be depleted before main battle. The Germans had lost seven reconnaissance aircraft in a week and the Jagdgeschwader were ordered to provide escorts.

=== 8 July ===
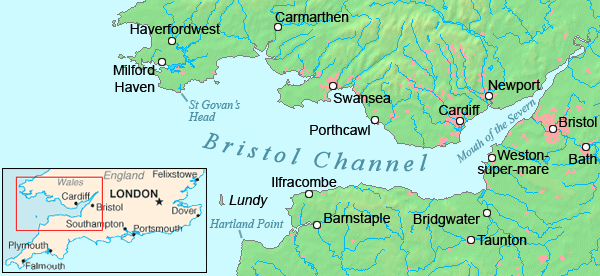
Bristol Channel

On 8 July, the weather was favourable for the Luftwaffe, with thick cloud extending from 1,500–20,000 ft (460–6,100 m) shielding the bombers from RAF fighters. A convoy sailing up the Bristol Channel was shadowed by a Do 17, that was intercepted by 92 Squadron and claimed destroyed, though this is not shown in German records. In the early hours a large CW convoy put to sea from the Thames Estuary to pass Dover at 12:00. At 11:30, a He 111 found near the convoy off the North Foreland was claimed shot down by Spitfires of 74 Squadron and appears to have escaped, though seen on fire, undercarriage down, diving into cloud. An hour later, radar picked up considerable aerial activity over the Pas de Calais. An unescorted Staffel of Do 17s was intercepted by 610 Squadron off Dover and dropped their bombs wide of the ships.

The Spitfires damaged a bomber but lost a pilot killed to return fire; six more Spitfires sighted Do 17s escorted by a Staffel of Bf 109s and a Bf 109 was claimed without loss. (A II./JG 51 Bf 109 force-landed, the pilot wounded.) Hurricanes of 79 Squadron took off from Hawkinge and north of Dover, were attacked and lost two pilots killed to Bf 109s. Kampfgeschwader 54 (KG 54) Ju 88s made ineffectual attacks and Geoffrey Allard of 85 Squadron shot down a KG 1 He 111 (the pilot was killed and the four crew members were posted missing). A Bf 109 from 4./JG 51 was shot down by 74 Squadron (Leutnant Johann Böhm being taken prisoner) and Squadron Leader D. Cooke of 65 Squadron was killed in the afternoon.

=== 9 July ===
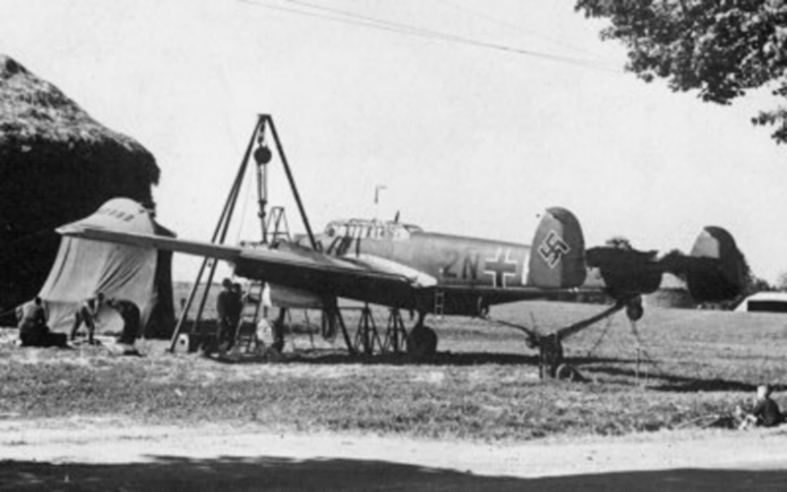
A Bf 110 of Zerstörergeschwader 76 (ZG 76); 9 July was the Bf 110's baptism of fire.

On 9 July Kesselring committed the Zerstörergeschwader (Destroyer Groups) to battle en masse for the first time against Britain. The first engagement took place when 257 Squadron damaged a Kampfgeschwader 3 (KG 3) Do 17, which crash-landed near Antwerp, Belgium with one crew member dead. A cold front generated thick cloud and caused the Luftwaffe to curtail operations. Park ordered section strength (3–4 aircraft) standing patrols over six small coastal convoys and moved 609 Squadron to RAF Warmwell, to cover Portland. A number of single-aircraft raids penetrated the defences and Do 17s bombed docks at Cardiff, damaging SS San Felipe (5,913 GRT) and the sloop HMS Foxglove. A local airfield was bombed and two pilots were killed on the ground.

At 12:45, Dover radar detected the build-up of a large formation behind the Pas de Calais and to prevent the Luftwaffe from using the cloud cover to approach unseen and attack the convoys from the trailing edge of the cloud base, Park ordered six squadrons from 11 Group into action. At 13:00 six Hurricanes were ordered up from RAF North Weald, where the station commander, Wing Commander Victor Beamish, became so impatient that he ordered his aircraft to be readied and took off in support, leading 151 Squadron. The Hurricanes were confronted with a formation of 100 bombers and fighters in a stepped up formation, ranging from 12,000–20,000 ft (3,700–6,100 m). The six Hurricanes formed two sections of three, one against the bombers and the others after the 60 Bf 109 and Bf 110 fighters. The German bomber crews exaggerated the number of Hurricanes and split into six formations, one finding itself over the convoy but its bombing was scattered and no ships were hit; a Hurricane was shot down and another damaged; Squadron Leader C. G. Lott was wounded, the Hurricanes probably being shot down by II./JG 51. In return III./Zerstörergeschwader 26 (ZG 26, Destroyer Group 26) commanded by Hauptmann Johann Schalk lost three Bf 110s destroyed and one damaged. Seven crewmen were posted missing, with one pilot safe, after being intercepted by 43 Squadron. No Bf 109 appears to have been lost and they prevented the RAF fighters from reaching the bombers.

Another Luftwaffe raid was mounted and Park, who had moved three squadrons to RAF Manston, was ready to intercept. The German raid reached the North Foreland around 15:50, 65 Squadron engaged the formation and shot down one Bf 109 from II./JG 51; the pilot was jposted missing. 17 Squadron Hurricanes reached the area and shot down a Kampfgeschwader 53 (KG 53) He 111, with the crew killed. Kesselring ordered Seenotflugkommando 1 with Heinkel He 59 float planes to rescue survivors, covered by a Staffel of Bf 109s. A He 59 found itself above a convoy and was attacked by 54 Squadron Spitfires, led by Al Deere. The He 59 was forced down on the Goodwin Sands and its crew was captured. Two Spitfire pilots were killed by the escorts from II./JG 51 for another Bf 109 and its pilot missing. The bombers hit SS Kenneth Hawksfield (1,546 GRT) and SS Pol Grange (804 GRT) with no casualties and Kenneth Hawksfield was beached, patched up two days later and returned to London docks.

The last sorties of the day were flown by 27 I./Sturzkampfgeschwader 77 (StG 77) Ju 87s, led by Hauptmann Friedrich-Karl Lichtenfels, escorted by Bf 110s, which attacked the Portland naval base. Intercepted by 609 Squadron, Lichtenfels was killed with his gunner and a Spitfire pilot was killed by the Bf 110 escort; Lichtenfels was a Knight's Cross of the Iron Cross holder and experienced pilot. A Bf 110 escort from 13./LG 1 was also lost. The 7,085 GRT freighter Empire Daffodil was damaged. Further east, up the North Sea coast, a raid over Norwich by Kampfgeschwader 26 (KG 26) He 111s killed 26 civilians and 17 Squadron destroyed one of the bombers; the crew was killed.

== Kanalkampf ==
=== 10 July ===
Göring's 30 June order had delegated responsibility of attacking shipping to II. Fliegerkorps (II Air Corps, Bruno Loerzer) and VIII. Fliegerkorps (VIII Air Corps, Wolfram Freiherr von Richthofen) since they contained most of the Ju 87 Stuka units. Loerzer appointed Geschwaderkommodore Johannes Fink, the commander of KG 2 as Kanalkampfführer (Channel Battle Leader). JG 51 (Theo Osterkamp) was based at Wissant, close to KG 2 and until other Jagdgeschwader could be brought to action. JG 51 was the Jagdwaffe spearhead over England and had been carrying out fighter sweeps over Kent but bomber escort deprived the fighters of freedom of action. Fink devised a compromise in which the Messerschmitt Bf 110 Zerstörergeschwader (Destroyer Groups) flew close escort and the Bf 109s roamed, to engage British fighters at a tactical advantage. A Do 17 of 4.(F)/121 was sent out to reconnoitre the Channel in thick cloud and rain, accompanied by a Staffel of Bf 109s from I./JG 51 and 74 Squadron scrambled six Spitfires to intercept, which damaged the Do 17 for two Spitfires damaged by the Bf 109s.

==== Convoy CW 3 ====
Eight convoys were at sea and the German formation had time to report the composition and heading of Convoy CW 3 (code-named Bread) before being intercepted. The convoy was sailing in ballast from the Thames Estuary and rounded the North Foreland at 10:00. Fink alerted KG 2, with III./ZG 26 as close escort and JG 51 as high cover. While the operation was being prepared, a Staffel of Bf 109s on a sweep over Dover shot down a 610 Squadron Spitfire without loss. Park sent up a patrol over Convoy Bread from 32 Squadron at 13:15 GMT and at 13:30, when it was clear the Germans were mounting a stronger raid, dispatched 56 Squadron, 111 Squadron and 74 Squadron. Twenty minutes later the formations met over the convoy, about 26 Do 17s from I./KG 2, all three Staffeln of I./ZG 26 Bf 110s and two Staffeln of I./Jagdgeschwader 3 (JG 3, which had just arrived in France). Mistaking the Bf 110s for Do 17s, the leader of 32 Squadron reported 60 bombers and called for reinforcements; Park had already ordered three more squadrons into action.

A dog-fight between around 100 aircraft broke out; it was difficult for the RAF fighters to co-ordinate attacks, since the radio was full of chatter between pilots and the Bf 109s frustrated British attacks on the bombers. No 111 Squadron made head-on attacks into the Do 17s and a Hurricane collided with a bomber, the body of Pilot Officer Higgs later being washed ashore in the Netherlands. The Do 17, flown Staffelkapitän (Squadron Leader) Hauptmann Krieger, also crashed with the loss of two crew. (Higgs may have been hit by Walter Oesau of III./JG 51 and lost control before the collision.) The interception managed to disrupt the bombing and only a 700 GRT sloop was sunk by the 150 bombs dropped. Six 64 Squadron Spitfires arrived and harassed the Germans all the way back to the French coast. A Bf 110 was shot down by 64 Squadron and another by 56 Squadron, a Do 17 was shot down by 111 and 66 squadron aircraft and two more were shot down by 32 Squadron. A Bf 109 of 2./JG 3 and one from II./JG 51 were shot down and two were damaged, one pilot being rescued by a He 59 and a Hurricane from 111 Squadron was damaged. The Dutch SS Bill S (466 GRT), from Convoy CW 3 was badly damaged and sank 6.7 mi (10.8 km) off Dungeness, all the crew surviving.

==== Falmouth ====
In other attacks, Luftwaffe bombers sank the British tanker Tascalusa (6,499 GRT) in Falmouth Harbour. The Greek Mari Chandris (5,840 GRT) from Convoy HG 33, which had been towed to Falmouth in June after a collision, was set on fire by Tascalusa, the crew being rescued. Tascalusa was refloated on 29 August and beached at Mylor Flats for scrapping. The British SS Waterloo (1,905 GRT) was sunk by Ju 88s and the crew rescued. The British tanker Chancellor (7,085 GRT), from Convoy OA 170, was damaged by an aircraft off Falmouth and the Dutch salvage tug Zwarte Zee was sunk by bomb splinters from near-misses.

=== 11 July ===
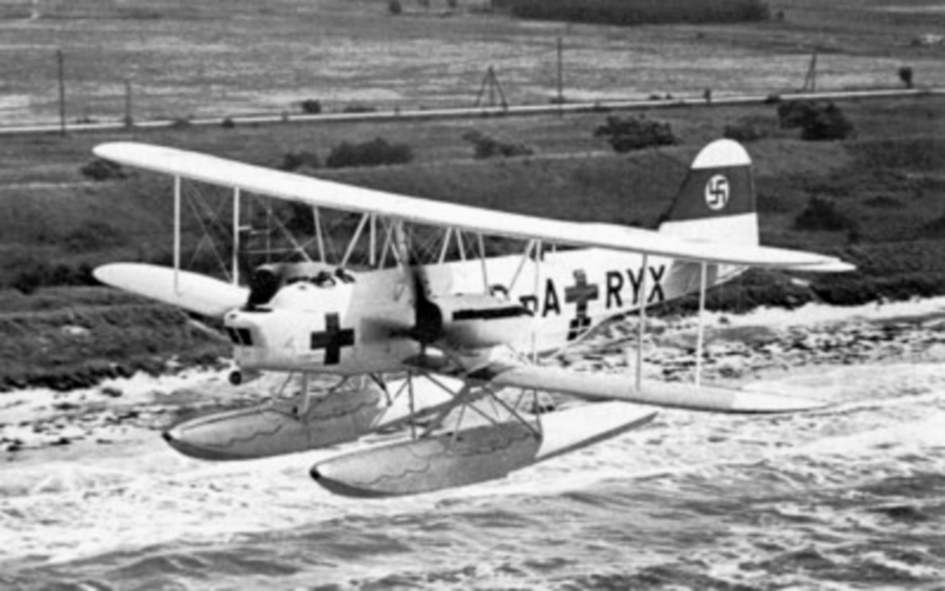
A Heinkel He 59, August 1940; He 59 units conducted air–sea rescue operations in the Channel.

Richthofen ordered Fliegerkorps VIII to prepare for operations at first light and taking off at 07:00 from the Cherbourg Peninsula, Ju 87s from StG 2 (Geschwaderkommodore Oskar Dinort) attacked shipping along the coast. The Stukas intercepted the British steam yacht HMS Warrior (1,124 GRT) and the 36-year-old ship was sunk with one casualty. 501 Squadron had scrambled but was engaged by the Bf 109 escort and lost one pilot shot down and drowned; 609 Squadron arrived as the Ju 87s began their dives. The six Spitfires split, one section of three engaging the Stukas and the other taking on the escort. Overwhelmed by odds of 6:1, the squadron was routed, with the loss of two pilots killed for no loss to the Germans; none of the merchant vessels were hit.

A relay of German reconnaissance aircraft observed British waters during the morning, Luftwaffe aircraft flying as far north as Scotland. Over Yarmouth, a Hurricane was damaged by return fire from a Do 17 and then the Dornier was shot down by Douglas Bader of 242 Squadron based at RAF Coltishall. Squadron Leader Peter Townsend, 85 Squadron, bailed out near Harwich after being hit by a Do 17 belonging to II./KG 2, which returned with three wounded crew. Encouraged by the relative immunity of the Stukas in the morning attack, Hugo Sperrle ordered Luftflotte 3 to follow up the attack; Bf 110s from ZG 76 would provide escort in place of the Bf 109s. At 11:00 GMT, Hurricanes from 601 Squadron were scrambled to intercept a reconnaissance Do 17, missed it and stumbled into a formation of Ju 87s from III./StG 2 escorted by about 40 Bf 110s, that radar had failed to locate. The escorts were too high above the Ju 87s to stop the first attack. Most squadrons in the Middle Wallop sector were re-fuelling but six 238 Squadron Hurricanes were scrambled, with three more from 501 and 87 Squadrons and nine from 213 Squadron near Exeter. None arrived in time to stop the attack on Portland at 11:53 GMT but little damage was done and only one vessel was damaged.

A dog-fight occurred near the Dorset coast, when 87 Squadron attacked the escort out of the sun and the squadron leader, John Dewar, hit the Bf 110 of Staffelkäpitain Oberleutnant Gerhard Kadow; the aircraft crash-landed and Kadow tried to destroy his aircraft but was shot by approaching soldiers. Oberleutnant Hans-Joachim Göring, nephew of Hermann Göring and his gunner Unteroffizier Albert Zimmermann crashed into a cliff top at the Verne Citadel on the Isle of Portland, both being killed. Leutnant Friedrich-Wolfgang Graf von und zu Castell tried to help Göring but was killed, four Bf 110s from 9. Staffel were lost along with their crews. A Ju 87 was destroyed and another force-landed, the light Stuka losses were a result of the Bf 110s bearing the brunt of the attacks. One Hurricane was slightly damaged and its pilot unhurt. Hans-Joachim Göring was the first German fighter pilot to die on British soil. The British SS Kylemount (704 GRT) was damaged off Dartmouth, SS Peru (6,961 GRT) and City of Melbourne (6,630 GRT) were damaged in Portland harbour. Eleanor Brooke (1,037 GRT) was damaged off Portland and the Dutch SS Mies (309 GRT) was damaged south of Portland Bill.

In the evening a He 59 off the Cornish coast was forced down by engine failure and another landed to rescue the crew. Coastguards sighted the Germans and two destroyers were sent from Plymouth to capture the aircraft. Blenheims from 236 Squadron shot down a Ju 88 and damaged a He 111 from Kampfgeschwader 55 (KG 55) that attempted to interfere. A He 59 was lost and the other evacuated the crew. During the night, raids on Rochester and Chatham killed 36 people. KG 54 was also involved in the convoy operation.

=== 12 July ===
==== Convoys Booty and Agent ====
On 12 July, dawn was showery with grey, overcast skies when Booty, a large convoy set out from the Thames Estuary steaming south-west 12 nmi (22 km; 14 mi) off Orfordness on the Essex coast and Agent, another convoy, off North Foreland in Kent. The Luftwaffe and Regia Aeronautica (Italian Air Force) attacked Booty and 17 Squadron took off from RAF Debden to patrol the convoy. While en route, the pilots were warned of a raid and 85 Squadron from Martlesham, 242 Squadron, led by Bader, from Coltishall, six Boulton Paul Defiants from 264 Squadron based at RAF Duxford and eleven Hurricanes of 151 Squadron from North Weald, were dispatched. Two Do 17 Staffeln of II./KG 2 and III./Kampfgeschwader 53 (KG 53), were intercepted by 17 Squadron and attacked at 08:48, as the Germans began to bomb. One He 111 and a Do 17 were shot down, a Staffelkapitän Hauptmann Machetzki being killed with his crew. The bombers flew in a tight formation and their crossfire damaged several Hurricanes and shot down two, killing a pilot from 85 Squadron. Two He 111s and two Do 17s were shot down. Trawlers from Booty rescued German aircrew despite the falling bombs. A further He 111 from Stab/KG 55 was shot down by Spitfires on armed reconnaissance, a crew man being killed.

SS Hornchurch (2,162 GRT), from Convoy FS 19 was sunk and the crew rescued by the sloop HMS Widgeon. SS Josewyn (1,926 GRT) was damaged 8 nmi (15 km; 9.2 mi) west-north-west of St Catherine's Point. Having missed the chance to attack Convoy Agent, Luftflotte 3 sent out more reconnaissance He 111s and Do 17s to track shipping. A He 111 from KG 55 was lost during the afternoon against 43 Squadron Hurricanes and the Luftwaffe failed to find and attack convoys. Later that night Geschwaderkommodore Alois Stoeckl led KG 55 on a night attack against Cardiff without loss.

=== 13–18 July ===
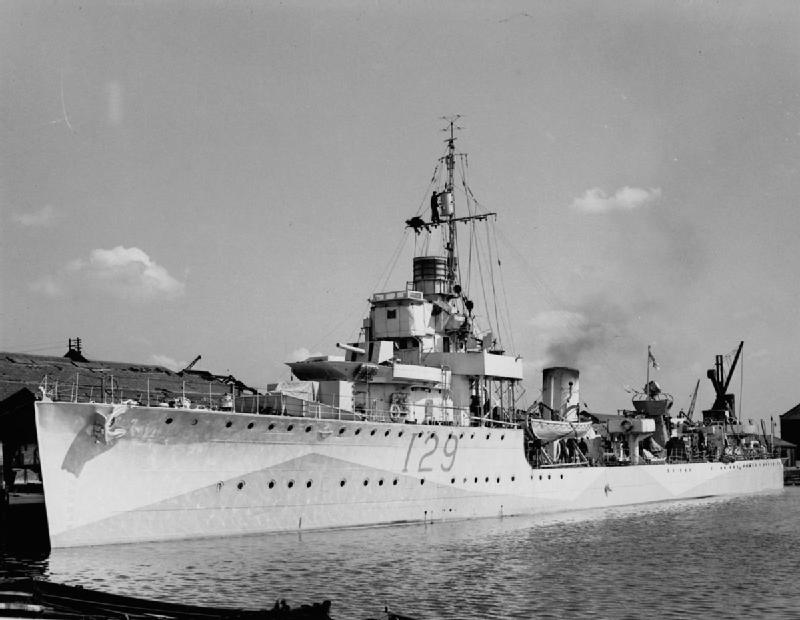
HMS Vanessa—the first destroyer casualty of the Kanalkampf.

On 13 July other, smaller convoys ran the gauntlet through the Channel. A II./Kampfgeschwader 51 (KG 51) Ju 88 was shot down by a 43 Squadron Spitfire while shadowing a convoy. The convoy was heading west and was in the area of Lyme Bay when 238 and 609 squadrons, with 12 Hurricanes and three Spitfires, were ordered to mount an aerial guard. Convoy CW 5 was late and instead they found no ships but fifty Luftwaffe aircraft searching for the convoy. Two Do 17s were shot down for one pilot killed in a forced landing. V./LG 1 Bf 110 fighter-bombers attempted to engage but became embroiled in a dogfight with RAF fighters who claimed three damaged for no loss. One damaged claim was filed by John Dundas.

As Convoy Bread sailed out of range, the smaller convoy was attacked by StG 1 escorted by three Staffeln of JG 51. Eleven Hurricanes of 56 Squadron engaged the Ju 87s before the Bf 109s could react, two Ju 87s were damaged but the escorts shot down two Hurricanes. Spitfire of 54 Squadron attacked the Bf 109s and New Zealander Colin Falkland Gray shot down Leutnant Hans-Joachim Lange, who was killed. Luftwaffe losses were six aircraft destroyed and eight damaged; four Hurricanes were shot down and a Spitfire was shot down in error by the Dover defences. HMS Vanessa was disabled by near-misses and was taken under tow by tug Lady Duncannonand and repaired in November 1940.

Bad weather over the next few days reduced operations and on 14 July, Kesselring sent the IV.(St)/LG 1 Ju 87s against convoys, when the escorts from III./JG 3 and II./JG 51 shot down a Hurricane from 615 Squadron but only one Ju 87 and one Bf 109 were destroyed, another making a forced-landing. The air battle took place over a convoy which was recorded by Charles Gardiner, a BBC reporter. No damage was done to the convoy but an armed merchant cruiser HMS Esperance Bay, carrying £10,000,000 in Gold bullion was badly damaged off Land's End, Lieutenant commander H. Close and six ratings being killed. The minelaying sloop TCG Yuzbasi Hakki of the Turkish Navy was damaged off Weymouth. Convoys CW 5 and CW 6 were also attacked and the British Mons (614 GRT) and the 1,129 GRT Norwegian steamship Balder were damaged, Island Queen (779 GRT) was sunk. The Belgian trawler Providentia (139 GRT) blew up with the loss of all hands, probably bombed by IV.(StG)/LG 1.

On 15 July, a Hurricane was shot down and the Luftwaffe lost a He 111, a Ju 88 and a Dornier Do 18 seaplane to RAF fighters. SS Heworth (2,855 GRT) in Convoy FN 223 was damaged and taken in tow for Harwich but ran aground. Four crewmen were killed and the survivors were rescued by the destroyer HMS Valorous. The steamship City of Limerick (1,359 GRT) was sunk and the destroyers HMS Mackay and HMS Broke went to rescue the crew. Two men were killed and the survivors were rescued by Belgian trawler Roger Jeannine. The Polish steamship Zbaraz (2,088 GRT) in Convoy FN 223, was badly damaged by German bombs 10 nmi (19 km; 12 mi) south of the Aldeburgh Light Vessel, taken in tow by the tug St Olaves but sank, with no casualties and the survivors rescued by trawler Vidonia and tug Muria. The Portuguese steamship Alpha (853 GRT) was sunk and the crew picked up by the destroyers HMS Bedouin, HMS Tartar and HMS Mashona.

On 16 July the RAF had no losses and shot down a KG 54 Ju 88, a Do 17 intruder from 5.(Nacht)/Jagdgeschwader 1 (JG 1) was shot down by RAF bombers. Next day, a He 111 and Ju 88 from III./KG 26 and I./KG 51 were shot down and one 64 Squadron Spitfire was lost with the pilot wounded. The Kanalkampf was having a serious effect on Fighter Command. The number of losses on paper was not high but the attrition of continuous patrols, 80 per cent over the sea, in poor weather; exhausted pilots and slowed the training of replacements. The dispersal by the Luftwaffe of its raids kept British pilots in action rather than resting and Fighter Command lost a disproportionate number of experienced squadron leaders and flight commanders from the 1/3 of the Fighter Command squadrons engaged. The growing number of Hurricanes in RAF Maintenance Command, meant that each squadron was allotted 18 fighters, allowing two flights of six to operate and to keep six in reserve for training and maintenance.

On 18 July, two 609 Spitfires were shot down by Ju 88s from I. and II./KG 54 which lost one Ju 88 destroyed and one damaged in return. A 603 Spitfire was damaged by a He 111 while KG 27 lost Geschwaderkommodore Oberst Bernhard Georgi and his crew, killed by 145 Squadron Hurricanes, for one Hurricane damaged. A 152 Squadron Spitfire was damaged and one 610 Squadron Spitfire was shot down by Bf 109s. One LG 1 Ju 88 fell to anti-aircraft fire while a StG 77 Do 17 reconnaissance aircraft was destroyed by 152 Squadron over a convoy.

=== 19 July ===
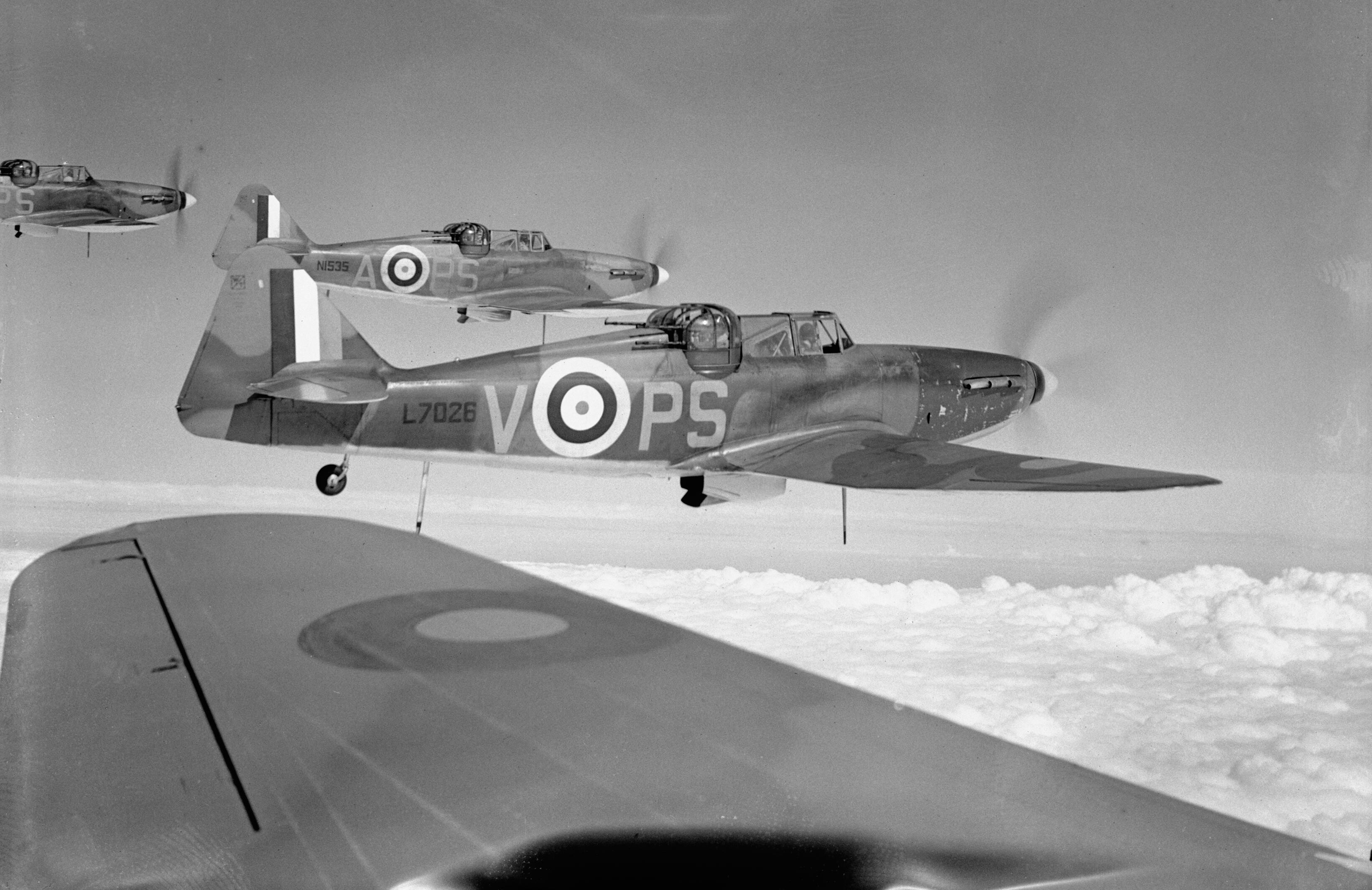
Defiants of 264 Squadron, August 1940

On 19 July nine convoys were at sea as German aircraft scouted the shipping lanes in the early morning. A Do 17 from 4.(F)/121 was shot down by 145 Squadron at 07:04. No 264 Squadron flying Boulton Paul Defiants, had operated with success over Dunkirk eight weeks earlier and its sister unit, 141 Squadron with twelve aircraft, was moved from West Malling to Hawkinge. The unit was inexperienced and while the aircraft were being fitted with Constant speed propellers in the early summer, the crews had little time to practice in the air; the gunners were uneasy about escaping from their turrets in an emergency. Dowding and Park had doubts about the Defiant but ordered 141 Squadron to escort a convoy that morning.

Osterkamp used a break in the weather to lead III./JG 51 on a patrol over the Dover area and spotted a formation of RAF aircraft at 12:45. Identifying them as Defiants, they attacked from the rear and below, to avoid return fire from the turret. Four Defiants were shot down on the first pass and another as it sought cloud cover. The Bf 109s were interrupted by 111 Squadron which shot down a Bf 109 into the sea and the four surviving Defiants escaped, one crash-landed, one was written off and the other two were damaged. Osterkamp noted that the pilots' delight with their success was tempered with knowledge of their own mortality after this mission.

Analysis suggested that the RAF controller failed to get the squadron airborne before the German aircraft arrived, because a scramble had only been ordered when German fighters had been seen by observers at RAF Hawkinge. The Bf 109s, with the advantage of height, inflicted a disaster on 141 Squadron. The German pilots quickly learned to distinguish the Defiant from other fighters and did not consider it formidable. Dowding reported on the battle to Churchill, telling him that many men had died; Churchill acknowledged Dowding's misgivings with the Defiant and turned away. The surviving Defiants saw very little action for the remainder of the battle; 19 July was the worst defeat of Fighter Command during the battle, the RAF losing ten aircraft against four from the Luftwaffe. Encouraged by the Luftwaffe successes, Hitler made his last "appeal to reason" that day and millions of copies of the speech were circulated in Britain.

Off Portland harbour, 87 Squadron intercepted Ju 87s without result and 64 Squadron shot down a Heinkel He 115 seaplane mining the Thames Estuary. III./KG 55 lost a bomber to 145 Squadron and against Bf 109s, 1 Squadron and 32 Squadron lost a Hurricane each, 43 Squadron lost two and one damaged, two pilots were seriously wounded and one was killed; 141 Squadron lost ten crew killed and one wounded. Although the losses on this day were small numerically, the British fighters had been defeated in each engagement. The Germans were more experienced, operating in greater numbers and the Bf 109 units were fighting with greater flexibility. Operating at generally higher altitudes, the Finger-four formation tactic used by German fighter pilots proved far more effective than the tight British formations. All the German pilots could scan the air but the British had to rely on the formation leader, while concentrating on keeping station.

At 12:15, StG 1 attacked the destroyer HMS Beagle off Dover and Beagle replied with its anti-aircraft guns and high-speed manoeuvres to escape the deluge of bombs from 40 to 50 Ju 87s. Several near misses damaged Beagle's gyro and engines but there were no casualties and Beagle made it back to Dover. At 16:00, German formations appeared over Dover and nine Do 17's from KG 2 and Ju 87s from StG 1 bombed the harbour, attacking in shallow dives. Twenty-two bombs were dropped and the oiler War Sepoy blew up, the tug Simla, the drifter Golden Drift and the destroyer HMS Griffin were damaged.

=== 20 July ===
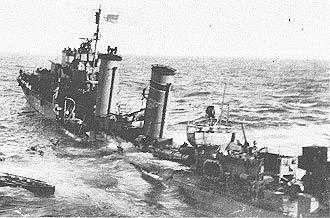
HMS Brazen, sinking after the 20 July air attack.

Around midnight on 19/20 July, a Focke-Wulf Fw 200 Kondor of Kampfgeschwader 40 (KG 40) ventured too far inland and was shot down by ground defences near Hartlepool and another was lost over Northern Ireland. German records show the losses on different dates but British sources are clear that both losses occurred that night. At dawn (05:21), 12 Hurricanes from 54 Squadron were scrambled to engage forty German aircraft approaching the Thames Estuary. The raid had been ordered on a convoy but the report was mistaken. The German formation split into smaller groups searching for the ships and British radar tracked the raiders but Hurricanes from 54 Squadron failed to intercept. Aircraft of 56 Squadron took off at 05:45, met a formation of Ju 88s from Kampfgeschwader 4 (KG 4), and forced one down near St Osyth. Several light vessels had been sunk along the coast; the vessels were tethered and sitting ducks. Radar usually picked up raiders before they reached the target area but the raids often occurred in poor light. Keith Park and Leigh-Mallory were concerned the Luftwaffe would attack lightships off the East Coast and agreed to aerial patrols over the coast near them.

==== Other convoys ====
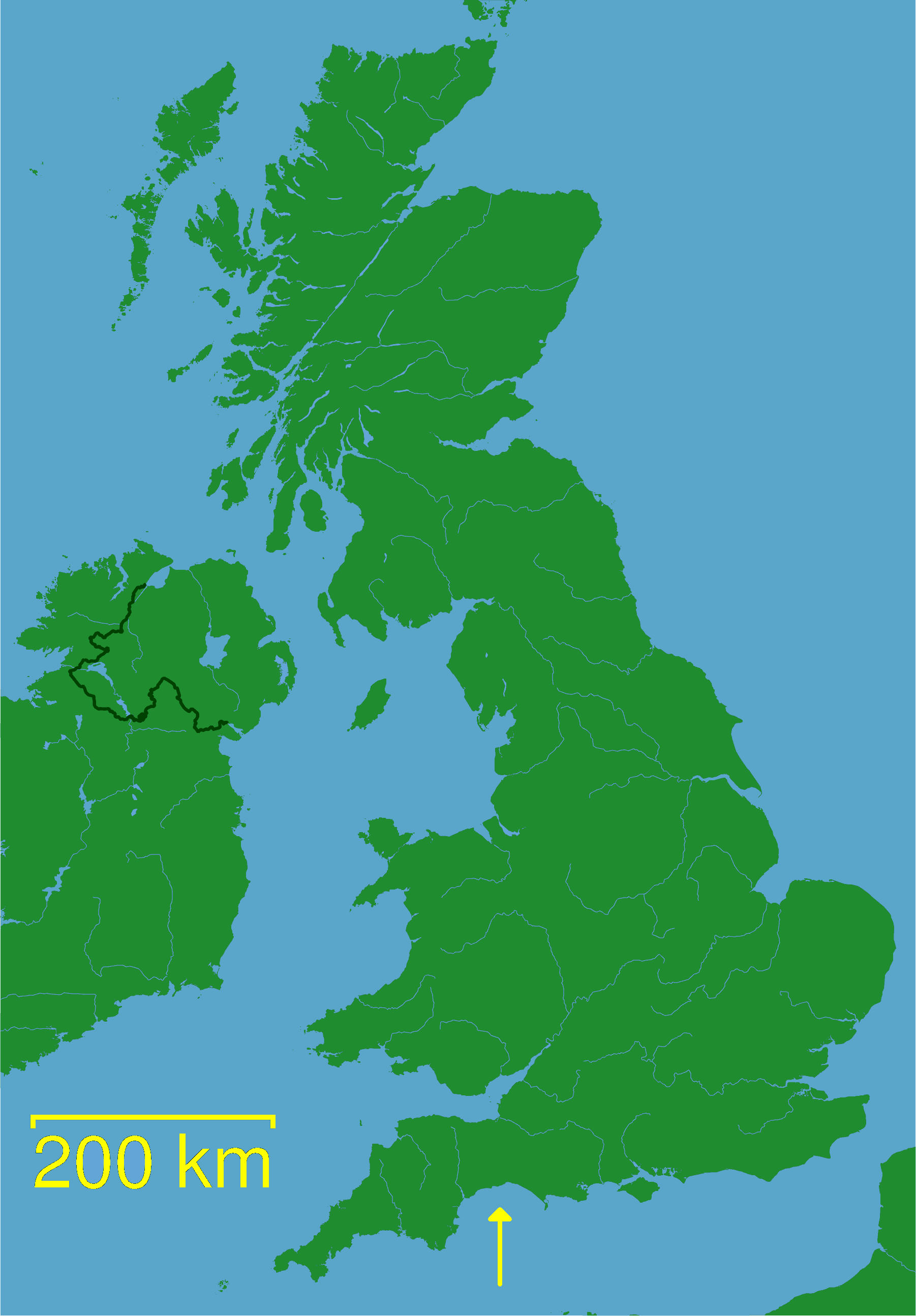
map showing Lyme Bay

Convoy Bosom sailed from Lyme Bay and Hurricanes from 238 Squadron chased off three Bf 109s; the Hurricanes spotted a Seenotflugkommando 4 He 59 ambulance at 14:30 and shot it down, killing the four crew. As Bosom steamed eastwards, another He 59 from Seenotflugkommando 1 shadowing the convoy was attacked by 43 Squadron. A Hurricane was shot down, the pilot bailed out but drowned and the He 59 escaped into cloud. Aircraft from 601 Squadron took over and the Heinkel was shot down; the crew bailed out too low and their parachutes failed to open. As Bosom reached the RAF Kenley and RAF Biggin Hill sectors, there had been plenty of time for the He 59s to report it and Park ordered standing patrols of 24 fighters over it, split evenly between Spitfire and Hurricanes.

At 18:00, II./StG 1 took off to attack Convoy Bosom with about 50 Bf 109 fighter escorts from I./JG 27, some Bf 110s, with Bf 109s from I. and II./JG 51 in support. Radar alerted the British and Hurricanes from 32 Squadron and 615 Squadron with Spitfire high cover from 5 Squadron and 610 Squadron had time to assemble and dive out of the sun. Two Ju 87s were shot down and four damaged, Leutnant Roden and his gunner being killed. The Geschwader (Group) also lost its Do 17 reconnaissance machine, shot down near the convoy. The Bf 110s stayed out of the action owing to the strength of the opposition but the Bf 109s reacted quickly and a 30-minute dogfight began. Three Bf 109s were shot down by Spitfires from 615 Squadron. One Bf 109 from I. and II./JG 51 were lost to 32 Squadron and 65 Squadron and 32 Squadron lost a Hurricane and its pilot against JG 51; 501 Squadron lost a fighter and its pilot, a Spitfire from 610 Squadron was written off and its pilot severely wounded. The most notable German loss was Hauptmann Riegel, commanding officer of I./JG 27; James "Ginger" Lacey shot down two Bf 109s. While the RAF fighters were dog-fighting, the Ju 87s attacked the convoy and sank the coaster Pulborough. The Ju 87s then attacked the destroyer HMS Brazen, which was hit several times and broke in two.

=== 21–24 July ===
==== Convoy CW 7 ====
On 21 July, Park established standing patrols of twelve fighters over the westbound Convoy CW 7 that passed through the Strait of Dover. A Bf 110 over Goodwood and a Do 17 were shot down by 238 Squadron. The convoy reached the Isle of Wight at daybreak and Do 17s escorted by around 50 Bf 109s and Bf 110s from III./JG 27 and V./LG 1 attacked the convoy south of the Needles, where 43 Squadron engaged the formation, shooting down a Bf 109 and a Bf 110 for one pilot killed; 238 Squadron claimed the Bf 110 and the Dorniers failed to damage the ships. The only other daylight action was the destruction of a Do 17 from 4.(F)/121 by Hurricanes of 145 Squadron and 23 July was quiet, a Ju 88 from 4.(F)/121 being shot down by 242 Squadron near Great Yarmouth. A small convoy passed the strait on 24 July and was attacked by Do 17s from KG 2. Spitfires from 54 Squadron intercepted the attack, no ships were hit and no aircraft were shot down. In the afternoon, StG 1 sank Terlings and the Norwegian steamship Kollskegg.

=== 25 July ===
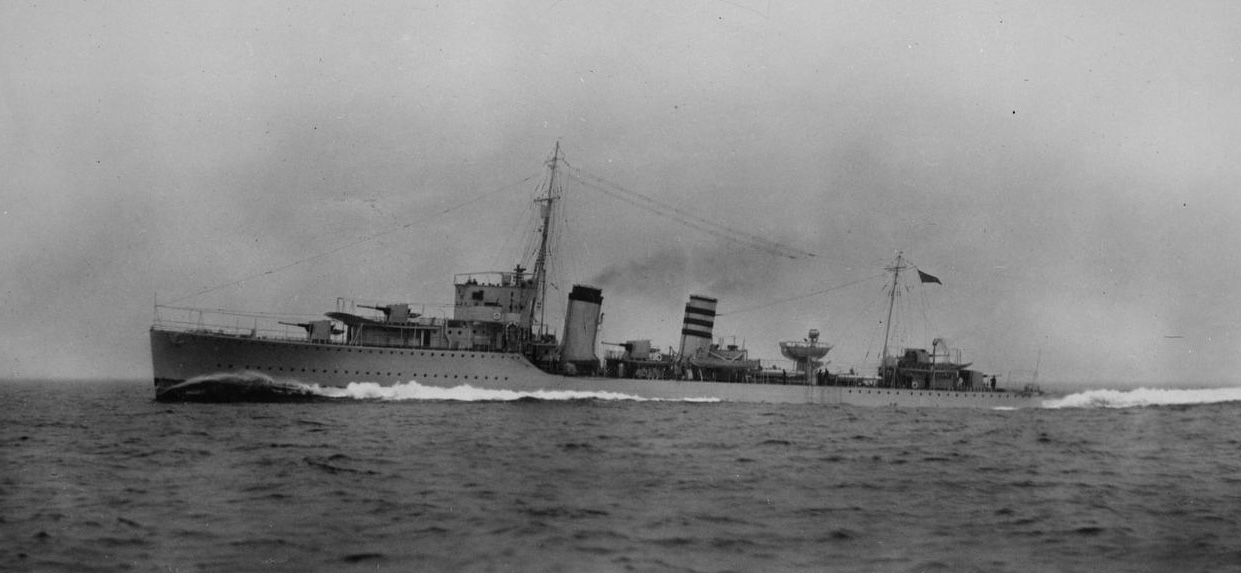
Codrington was sunk on 27 July 1940 by He 111s.

Luftflotte 2 carefully timed fighter and bomber sweeps throughout 25 July to exhaust the RAF standing patrols. Once British fighter opposition had spent itself against the Bf 109s, large bomber formations could attack the convoys before reinforcements arrived. At noon, 65 Squadron engaged JG 52 and shot down A Bf 109. Nine 32 Squadron Hurricanes and 11 from 615 Squadron engaged more than 40 Bf 109s in a dogfight near Dover and one Hurricane was badly damaged. As the battle receded, Ju 87s from 11.(Stuka)/LG 1 and III./StG 1 attacked the convoy. Distress calls from the ships were answered by 54 Squadron which sent nine Spitfires but Bf 109 fighters shot down two Spitfires for no loss.

Park noted the German attempts to saturate the defences and sent only small numbers of fighters over convoys until a bigger attack developed. In the afternoon, eight Spitfires of 64 Squadron engaged 30 Ju 88s from III./KG 4 escorted by over 50 Bf 109s. Three more Spitfires from 64 Squadron scrambled followed by 12 Hurricanes from 111 Squadron at Hawkinge which used head-on attacks to break up the formation, which abandoned the attack, the Bf 109s covered their retreat. So many Luftwaffe fighters were airborne that British ground controllers were unable to tell which raids contained bombers, as opposed to fighter aircraft and the standing patrol was never numerous enough to prevent four dive-bomber attacks.

==== Convoy CW 8 ====
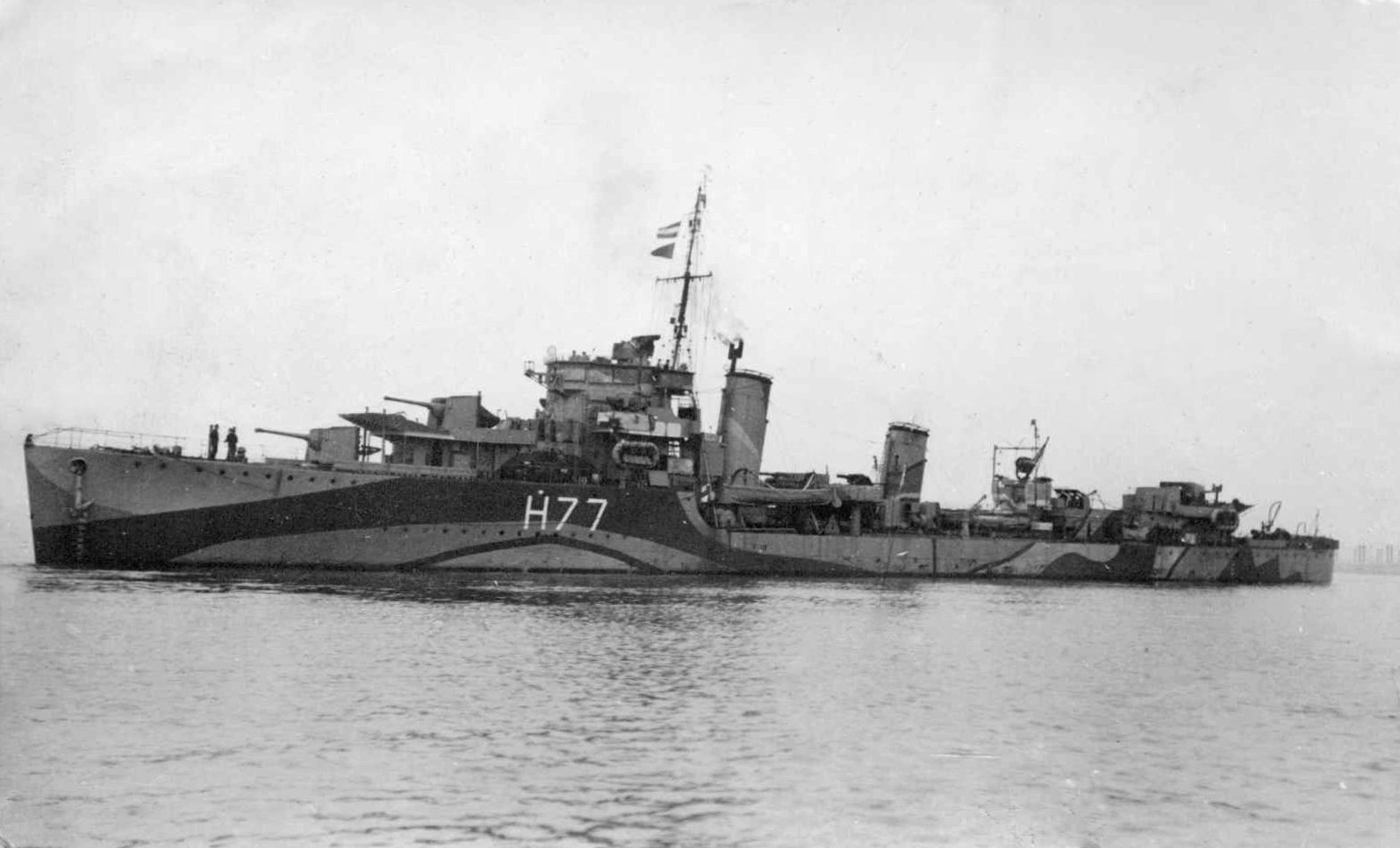
HMS Boreas, damaged escorting CW 8

Convoy CW 8 of 21 ships had set out from the Medway at 11:00 on 25 July with a standing patrol overhead and was attacked by 18 Do 17s escorted by 40 Bf 109s from III./Jagdgeschwader 26 (JG 26 Adolf Galland). No 43 Squadron attacked JG 26 while six 65 Squadron Spitfires joined in and 610 Squadron scrambled to cut off the German return route but 65 Squadron could not destroy any of the Do 17s, because of their formation-flying and defensive cross-fire. JG 26 lost two Bf 109s; one falling to Colin Falkland Gray, two pilots being killed and one wounded. Running low on fuel, the Bf 109s used the advantage of their fuel-injected engines to dive away. The RAF pilots thought that they had been shot down and claiming six, with eight probables. Bf 109s from III./Jagdgeschwader 52 (JG 52) covered the withdrawal of JG 26, running into Spitfires from 610 Squadron and lost three Bf 109s, and a Spitfire pilot was killed and one wounded during a force-landing.

A Ju 88 from I./LG 1 and a He 111 from an unidentified unit were lost with their crews. CW 8 was attacked by Ju 87s from 11.(Stuka)/LG 1 and III./StG 1, off Folkestone, five ships being sunk and four damaged, including the destroyers HMS Boreas and Brilliant before 56 Squadron arrived. Nine E-Boats attacked the convoy and hit three with gunfire. Three Spitfires from 64 Squadron and ten from 54 Squadron arrived; the Bf 109s kept the RAF fighters at bay, shooting down a Spitfire and killing its pilot; some of the Ju 87s were damaged by naval gunfire. Two Bf 109s from JG 52 were shot down by 610 Squadron. Squadron Leader Thompson, the commander of 111 Squadron reported that he was twice attacked by Spitfires. On 26 July, E-boats sank three ships and only eleven passed Dungeness. The German attacks on the convoy showed that far more fighters would be needed to protect convoys in the Dover Strait.

=== 26 July ===
Fliegerkorps VIII sent 30 Ju 87s to attack Convoy CW 8 off Portland, which were intercepted by 238 Squadron Hurricanes, which shot down one before the Bf 109s escorts intervened. A second wave of Ju 87s and Ju 88s were protected by Bf 109s which countered 238 Squadron Hurricanes and 609 Squadron which lost a Spitfire. By dusk, the Admiralty had decided losses to merchant shipping had become prohibitive and cancelled all traffic through the Dover Strait. A 32 Squadron Hurricane was damaged and its pilot wounded, 54 Squadron lost three Spitfires, with two pilots killed, 64 Squadron lost two Spitfires and one damaged with two pilots killed and 152 Squadron lost a pilot killed by Bf 109s. II./KG 51 lost a Ju 88, StG 1 a Do 17 and a Ju 87. III./JG 27 lost one Bf 109 and JG 52 four Bf 109s. A KG 4 Ju 88 was lost over the Bristol Channel and a He 111 was shot down off Wick.

=== 27 July ===
Early on 27 July news reached Luftflotte 3 in Paris that a large convoy was departing Portland and 30 Ju 87s from I./StG 77 took off from Caen at 08:00, picking up their Bf 109 escort from JG 27 en route. 10 Group dispatched three Hurricanes from RAF Middle Wallop, arriving just as the Ju 87s began to attack and shot down a Ju 87 before the Bf 109s intervened. Convoy Bosom reached Swanage at 09:45 and a second wave of Ju 87s arrived; nine RAF fighters tried to intercept but failed and lost a 610 Squadron pilot killed. Later on, Hurricanes from 615 Squadron shot down another He 59 off Deal. He 111s attacked shipping off Dover and sank the destroyers, HMS Codrington at Dover and HMS Wren off Aldeburgh with heavy bombs, KG 53 taking credit for the latter vessel, for the loss of a He 111, probably to 504 Squadron. The loss of two destroyers led the Admiralty to abandon Dover as an advanced base for destroyers.

=== 28 July ===
Sunday 28 July was sunny and clear when Spitfires of 234 Squadron were ordered to a plot south of Plymouth, found a II./LG 1 Ju 88 and shot it down with only two survivors. Big attacks were anticipated and the Biggin Hill, North Weald and Hornchurch sector controllers moved eight squadrons to Hawkinge, Manston and Martlesham. At 13:50 a large raid was detected forming up and heading to Dover and 74 Squadron took off to intercept. Several other units were sent with instructions for the Hurricanes to attack bombers and Spitfires to engage the fighters. The bombers flew off to the south without bombing and Malan engaged I. and II./JG 51, led by Geschwaderkommodore Werner Mölders, on his first sortie over England. The Bf 109s were also engaged by 41 Squadron and Malan destroyed one Bf 109, then damaged a second. (Note: Legend has it that this was Mölders but post-war research suggests that he was hit by a 41 Squadron Spitfire.)

Three JG 51 Bf 109s were shot down with two pilots killed and one missing, three fighters force-landed, one with 20 per cent damage and the other 50 per cent; Mölders' machine was 80 per cent damaged and he was wounded. 74 Squadron lost three Spitfires, with two pilots wounded and one killed. One Bf 109 from II./JG 27 and another from III./JG 53 force-landed, the pilots wounded, probably by 41 Squadron. Two Ju 88s from 9./KG 4 were damaged by anti-aircraft fire over the Thames Estuary, with one crew member killed and seven wounded. Seenotflugkommando 1 and 3 lost two He 59s, rescuing airmen in the Channel. KG 4 were engaged in mine laying operations in July.

=== 29 July ===
The dawn mist cleared and the fine weather and cloudless skies promised much German activity. The Kent Sector Operations Room received news of a German build-up over Calais. Two convoys were in the Channel in the 11 Group area but the controllers waited. At 07:20 it became clear as the convoys passed the Dover Strait that Dover was the target and 11 Spitfires from 41 Squadron were ordered to attack the right flank and 12 Hurricanes of 501 Squadron from Hawkinge, the German left. The formation consisted of 48 Ju 87s from six Staffeln of IV.(Stuka)/LG 1, II./StG 1 and II./StG 3. The escort consisted of 80 Bf 109s from JG 51 and III./JG 26, the former led by Galland as Mölders was recovering from the wound received the day before.

The leading escort formation was on the extreme right, looking down-sun at the Stukas but when 41 Squadron dived to attack the Ju 87s, they were not seen by III./JG 26. JG 51 engaged the Spitfires which split against the escorts. 41 Squadron lost one Spitfire shot down and its pilot killed, four damaged and forced to crash-land. While 41 Squadron fought the fighters, 501 Squadron attacked the Ju 87s as they began to dive and the harbour suffered little damage. StG 1 and LG 1 lost two Stukas each and II./StG 3 reported one damaged, 501 Squadron suffering no losses. The steamship Gronland was sunk in the outer harbour with 19 crew killed, having already been damaged in the attacks of 25 July. The patrol yacht Gulzar was sunk but the crew were saved; Sandhurst was destroyed. (The men of Sandhurst received six mentions in dispatches and the Dover port personnel were awarded four George Medals—the last to Tug Harbour Master Captain F. J. Hopgood.)

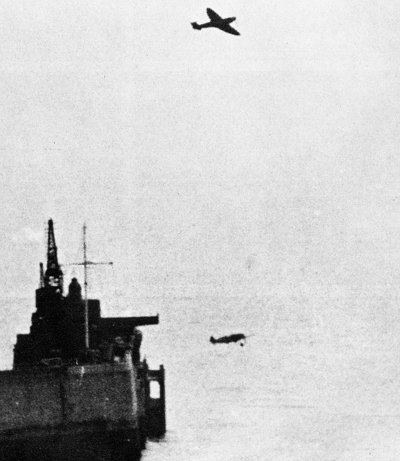
A Spitfire overflies a ditching Bf 109

III./KG 76 sent Ju 88s under the British radar to bomb the convoys from low altitude but the bombers scored no direct his or near misses. The Gruppenkommandeur, Adolf Genth, was killed when he flew into a balloon cable off Dungeness and another was lost with its crew, when it was shot down by the escort ships. Observers called for fighter assistance and 610 Squadron Spitfires were sent but the Ju 88s were long gone. The other convoy was attacked by KG 2 after a Dornier from the Stab. Staffel reported its position and was then chased to the French coast by Spitfires from 85 Squadron damaged and made a forced-landing at Saint-Inglevert Airfield. Eight Bf 110s from 1. Staffel and three from 2. Staffel, were met near Dunkirk by 30 Bf 110 escorts from ZG 26 and were attacked by 151 Squadron Hurricanes. Two Hurricanes force-landed, the pilots unharmed, an Erpro 210 Bf 110 was damaged and ZG 26 suffered no losses, the attackers claiming hits on a 1,000 GRT and an 8,000 GRT ship.

At 19:25 III./StG 2 Ju 87s led by Gruppenkommandeur Walter Enneccerus sank the destroyer HMS Delight 13 nmi (24 km; 15 mi) off Portland. The ship was crippled and on fire, as the Stukas left the scene unchallenged and Delight made for the coast off Portland. The destroyers HMS Vansittart and Broke rescued 147 men and 59 wounded but 19 of the crew were killed. The burning vessel remained afloat until 21:30, when there was a large explosion and it sank. The Admiralty withdrew all destroyer flotillas from the Channel and ordered no convoy to sail the Channel in daylight. This order had been given on 26 July before Delight sailed and some sources note that standing orders had been broken. The Admiralty had issued instructions to abandon the Dover area as a merchant route on 26 July and on 29 July, RAF reconnaissance discovered that the Germans were assembling long-range guns at Calais, the Admiralty ordered the abandonment of Dover as a base in favour of Harwich and Sheerness. There was no desire on the part of the Admiralty to maintain a Destroyer division at Dover. Only one seaworthy destroyer, HMS Vivacious, remained. She was used to escort the crippled HMS Walpole and the damaged Brilliant, towed by the Lady Brassey to Sheerness. HMS Skate, the oldest destroyer in the navy, was lent to Dover Command by Portsmouth and the force was reinforced by HMS Bulldog until the return of the damaged vessels.

The Germans viewed the British naval withdrawal and suspension of merchant traffic as a success but the lack of targets for the Germans eliminated the need for Fighter Command to engage the Luftwaffe over the Channel. The Germans now had to fly into southern England, which put the Bf 109, the best German fighter, at the limit of its endurance. Hitler's Directive No. 17 expanded the scope of the air offensive from the English Channel to British airfields. When Göring held a meeting with the OKL staff at The Hague on 1 August, he emphasised the need for German fighters to conserve fuel, which remained a severe handicap for the Germans.

The Admiralty suspended convoys until they could be better defended but in the last week of the month, the busiest of the Kanalkampf, 103 ships had been escorted in convoy through the straits. Losses to air attack amounted to 24,000 long tons (24,000 t) from 10 July – 7 August, substantially less than sinking caused by mines. Convoy escort was made a combined operation and Fighter Command sent bigger formations over the convoys, since smaller formations had been shown to be too vulnerable against the tactical advantages of greater numbers, height and surprise enjoyed by the Luftwaffe. The larger formations could not prevent attacks on convoys but the standing patrols were less likely to be overwhelmed by German fighters. A Mobile Balloon Barrage Flotilla (MBBF) of small ships was established to inhibit air attacks and first sailed with Convoy CW 9 on 4 August and later on kites were used instead of balloons, which were too vulnerable to gunfire. A Channel Guard of sailors was trained at the gunnery school at Portsmouth to use light machine-guns and two to three teams joined each westbound ship on the Thames. After the journey the guard joined eastbound ships or took the train back to Southend.

The size of convoys was reduced by half and modern Hunt-class destroyers, better equipped for anti-aircraft operations, replaced the older escorts. More escorts were provided and convoys had minesweeper trawlers ahead, two destroyers in close escort, 3 to 4 anti-submarine trawlers, six Motor Anti-submarine Boats (MA/SBs) or Motor Launches, 6–8 MBBF balloon ships and larger formations of fighters overhead. More escorts could not prevent ships being sunk but the greater number of Fighter Command aircraft made dive-bombing much more difficult and losses never again became serious. On 5 August, CE 8 sailed east from Falmouth at night, sheltered in ports during the day and reached the Thames estuary with no losses. On 7 August, Convoy CW 9 sailed from the Thames Estuary with 25 ships. The convoy was attacked by E boats during the night, which sank three ships. By morning, when the Luftwaffe attacked, the remaining ships were scattered over 10 sq mi (26 km^{2}) but the raid was intercepted by 145 Squadron and no ships were sunk.

=== 30 July – 6 August ===
On 30 July, Britain was covered in low cloud and continuous rain, Dowding expecting the Germans to use the weather to hide their attacks and patrols were sent over convoys and minesweeper units but the Luftwaffe did not operate in strength. He 111s from KG 26 harassed the Scottish coast from bases in Norway, near Suffolk two Bf 110s of Erprobungsgruppe 210 (ErpGr, development unit) stalking a convoy, were caught by Geoffrey Allard and his wingman and after a long chase one German aircraft was shot down. The following day the weather improved but haze covered southern England. The Luftwaffe attempted some raids but could not find their targets, the RAF made two interceptions and Hurricanes from 111 Squadron damaged a Ju 88 from III./KG 76. At 16:00, six squadrons with 30 Spitfires and 24 Hurricanes were scrambled to Dover where Bf 109s were strafing barrage balloons. The 12 Spitfires from 74 Squadron led by Malan, engaged two Staffeln of JG 2 under the command of Harry von Bülow-Bothkamp. A flight from 74 Squadron engaged the Bf 109s at equal height but the second flight was attacked while climbing and lost two Spitfires and one pilot killed. The day ended with one 7./JG 2 Bf 109 destroyed and one pilot wounded, in exchange for two Spitfires lost and one damaged; two RAF pilots were killed.

On 1 August, Dowding returned the establishment of fighter squadrons to the pre-Battle of France figure of 20 aircraft plus two in reserve. The number of Fighter Command pilots also increased and 1,414 pilots were in service in July, compared to the establishment of 1,454. The success of pilot training led Dowding to increase the figure to a minimum of 1,588 pilots, creating a paper deficiency that led to the belief that Fighter Command was understaffed. The number of operational pilots never fell below the number available at the end of July. Dowding was more concerned by the dilution of pilot quality, losing more than 80 regular pilots and flight commanders, whose place was taken by less experienced men. A Henschel Hs 126 was shot down by 145 Squadron Hurricanes but the rear gunner killed one of the British pilots; both German airmen were posted missing. I./KG 4 crossed the coast near Norfolk, while Wing Commander Walter Beisiegel, the Coltishall Sector Controller, was busy organising convoy protection. The Boulton-Paul factories near Norwich and the Thorpe railway goods yards were damaged and the Germans escaped, despite the 66 and 242 Squadron airfields being 10 minutes flying time away. On 2 August, KG 26 He 111s attacked a convoy off Scotland and anti-aircraft fire brought one down on the deck of the steamship Highlander, which steamed to Leith, where the aircraft was displayed and another He 111 was shot down. ErpGr 210 sank the 590 GRT trawler Cape Finisterre. For the next five days both sides suffered virtually no combat casualties.

=== 7–8 August ===
==== Convoy CW 9 (Peewit) ====
At 07:00 on 7 August 1940, Convoy CW 9 (Peewit) carrying coal, sailed from Southend. A Do 17 crew of KG 2 on patrol over the Channel spotted two minesweepers searching for mines dropped by He 115s of Küstenflieger-Gruppe 106. The crew flew north into the North Sea, missing the large convoy approaching from the west and landed soon afterwards. Peewit continued through the Channel and reached Dover at 14:30, with three Hurricanes from 85 Squadron overhead. Winds were light but fog down to 2,000 ft (610 m) gave the convoy cover, with visibility from 2–5 nmi (3.7–9.3 km; 2.3–5.8 mi). As Peewit rounded Dover, it was escorted by relays of Hurricanes from 32, 615 and 501 squadrons and just under four hours later, reached Dungeness, unseen, as visibility improved, a German Freya radar station at Wissant detected the convoy.

At 18:30 the sighting was relayed to the headquarters of Alfred Saalwächter, Commander-in-Chief of Kriegsmarine Group Command West. The information was then passed to Kapitänleutnant Carl-Heinz Birnbacher, commander of 1. Schnellbootflottille (1st S-Boat Flotilla) in Cherbourg; the flotilla comprising S-27 (commanded by Oberleutnant zur See (OLt zS) Hermann Büchting with Birnbacher aboard), S-25 (OLt zS Siegfried Wuppermann), S-20 (OLt zS Götz Freiherr von Mirbach) and S-21 (OLt zS Bernd Klug) were ordered to readiness. The British ordered four Motor Torpedo Boats (MTBs) from Dover eastwards, to reconnoitre German movements among the French Channel ports. The MTBs sighted the German boats but did not engage, considering their mission was one of reconnaissance. Birnbacher suspected a trap and took a position off Beachy Head and Newhaven; at 02:00 on 8 August, the German attack began.

Büchting sank SS Holme Force with two torpedoes within a minute, the cargo of coke spilling into the sea and six of the 13 crew being killed. The British were surprised and thought that the noise of the E-boats (Schnellbooten) was an air attack; the Norwegian SS Tres stopped engines to avoid attracting attention and Fife Coast increased speed to 12 kn (22 km/h; 14 mph) and zig-zagged. With surprise gone, the Germans fired flares to illuminate the ships and Fife Coast was seen and sunk. The destroyer Bulldog arrived but could do little in the darkness, its gunners struggled to see the E-Boats. Polly M steamed through the wreckage of Fife Coast and threw the Germans off. Her Captain, P. Guy, stated the vessel blew up. SS Rye survived an attack by S-27 (It was sunk on 7 March 1941 by the same vessel.) and Wupperman attacked SS Polly M and SS John M. The captains evaded the torpedoes but Wuppermann raked SS Polly with machine-gun and cannon fire; the crew abandoned ship, only to re-board the next morning and got the ship into Newhaven. SS John was fired on for nearly two hours but remained afloat. The E-Boat crews claimed to have sunk 17,000 GRT of shipping but sank 2,588 GRT. At 04:20, Blenheims from 59 Squadron took off from Thorney Island to intercept the E-Boats but returned after three hours without success.

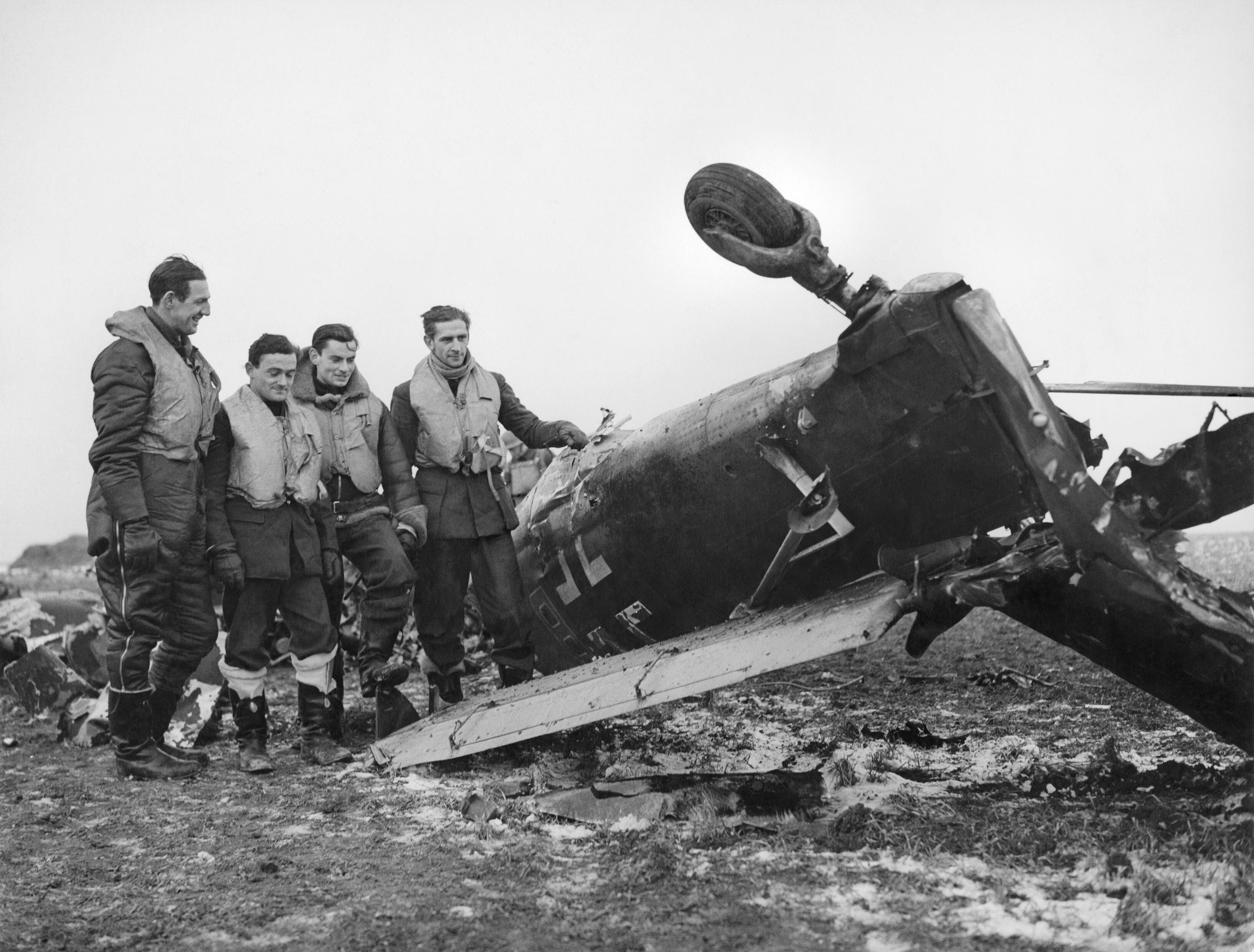
RAF pilots look at a Ju 87 shot down while attacking a convoy.

Next day dawned fine and Peewit was scattered over 10 sq mi (26 km^{2}), the leading ships with only the barrage balloon vessel HMS Borealis to guard against air attack. A Do 17P from 4.(F)/14 had been sent to report on the convoy and found 17 vessels south of Selsey Bill. The Dornier was spotted and the captain said, "Look! The angel of death". The Dornier reported the ships and Fliegerkorps VIII dispatched I. and II./StG 1 to attack the convoy. The Stukas dive-bombed the convoy from 09:00 to 10:45, covered by Bf 109s from JG 27. The Dutch vessel SS Ajax carrying a cargo of wheat was sunk in five minutes, with four men killed and four wounded; SS Coquetdale was sunk with two men wounded.

Hurricanes of 601 Squadron soon arrived but Spitfires from 609 Squadron and 234 Squadron arrived too late to engage, despite flying at full speed; three of their aircraft made emergency landings due to fuel shortage. Three Hurricanes from 145 Squadron made contact, joined by others later. In a confused engagement, III./StG 1 lost two Ju 87s, II./StG 1 suffered one damaged and three Bf 109s were shot down by 145 Squadron for a loss of two Hurricanes and pilots at 09:00.

In the late morning StG 2, 3 and 77 from Angers, Caen and St Malo were escorted by Bf 110s from V./LG 1, to attack the convoy south of the Isle of Wight, with about 30 Bf 109s from II. and III./JG 27 for high cover. From 12:20 p.m., Spitfires of 609 Squadron and Hurricanes from 257 and 145 squadrons, attacked the German formations, joined later by 238 Squadron. The Ju 87s severely damaged SS Surte, MV Scheldt and SS Omlandia and sank SS Balmaha soon after; SS Tres was sunk by StG 77. SS Empire Crusader, in the lead, was hit by StG 2 and sank several hours later; four ships had been sunk and four damaged. From 20 to 30 RAF fighters attacked the German aircraft and I. and II./StG 2 suffered one damaged Ju 87 each, StG 3 lost three Stukas from I. Gruppe and two damaged. LG 1 lost one Bf 110 and three damaged, JG 27 lost three Bf 109s of II Gruppe and two damaged. Three Hurricanes from 238 Squadron were shot down and two pilots were killed by Bf 109s. Squadron Leader H. A. Fenton was wounded while shooting down a He 59 floatplane and rescued by the trawler HMS Basset; 64 Squadron lost a Spitfire and 65 Squadron lost two over Dover from 10:45 to 12:07, along with the three pilots in unrelated engagements; JG 27 lost nine Bf 109s.

I./StG 1 looked for the convoy and while reporting 9/10 cloud cover, far from ideal for dive-bombing with the cloud-base from 3,500 to 4,000 ft (1,100 to 1,200 m) above the sea and Hozzel abandoned the mission. Hauptmann Waldemar Plewig the commander of II./StG 77 used his discretion to fly over the convoy from Le Havre in the unit Do 17P reconnaissance aircraft, found the conditions good enough for an attack and 82 Ju 87s from III./StG 1, I./StG 3 and Stab, II./StG 77 were alerted. Major Walter Sigel led StG 3 to rendezvous with escorts from Bf 110s from II./Zerstörergeschwader 2 (ZG 2, Destroyer Group 2), LG 1 and Bf 109s from II./JG 27.

III./JG 26, II. and III./JG 51 flew a fighter sweep to clear the skies before the attack and engaged 41, 64 and 65 squadrons, claiming eight Spitfires around 12:55 Central European Time (CET). Among the claimants were Joachim Müncheberg (11th claim) and Gerhard Schöpfel (5th and 6th claims). Schöpfel claimed a Blenheim from 600 Squadron which was lost with its crew after taking off from Manston in the midst of the battle. A 64 Squadron Spitfire was shot down with the pilot seriously wounded at 12:07 GMT, also at Manston; 41 Squadron suffered no losses and probably damaged a Bf 109 of II./JG 53 and one from III./JG 54 that arrived. Two Spitfires were lost by 65 Squadron at 10:45 GMT (earlier than the German claims at 12:55 CET.)

The ships of Peewit had sailed on and the anti-submarine yachts HMS Wilna, HMS Rion, the trawlers HMT Cape Palliser, HMT Kingston Chrysoberyl, HMT Kingston Olivine and HMT Stella Capella were attacked, having been sent to rescue survivors. Cape Palliser and Rion were badly damaged and Fighter Command sent 145 Squadron and 43 Squadron to defend the convoy. Just after 16:00, three 145 Squadron Hurricanes were lost with their pilots against Bf 110s and three more were lost from 43 Squadron, five of the pilots being killed. Three StG 77 Stukas were shot down by 145 Squadron and four were damaged by 43 Squadron (two were 70 per cent and 80 per cent damaged). LG 1 suffered two damaged Bf 110s and three Bf 109s from II./JG 27 were lost, two shot down by 43 Squadron and one was damaged; no ships were hit. Number 152 Squadron and 238 Squadron tried to intercept but failed to make contact with the attackers; 152 Squadron met Bf 109s from JG 53 12 mi (19 km) south of Swanage; two Spitfires were damaged and force-landed, the pilots unhurt. II./JG 53 claimed two Spitfires and a Hurricane for no loss; II./JG 53 commanded by Günther Freiherr von Maltzahn flew from Guernsey.

=== 11 August ===
The Luftwaffe flew few sorties from 9 to 10 August; Adlerangriff (Eagle Attack) had been postponed due to poor weather. On 11 August the size and tempo of German air operations increased now that a long period of clear and fine weather was predicted. The Luftwaffe attacked 10, 11 and 12 Groups and ships in the Channel. Kesselring hoped to draw out and disperse Fighter Command by sending out large numbers of single Staffeln. With the exception of the early morning, Park did not take the bait. While a high proportion of 11 Group aircraft were forced into the air it did not achieve Kesselring's aim of attracting reinforcements from the other groups.

In the morning Hauptmann Walter Rubensdörffer led 17 Bf 110s of Erprobungsgruppe 210 on a strafing attack on Dover. Covered by a flight of Bf 109s, the escort dispatched three of the eight barrage balloons from 961 Balloon Squadron. The Bf 110s released light bombs but did little damage. Park sent 74 Squadron (Adolph "Sailor" Malan) which ran into three Staffeln of Bf 109s from JG 51. The closing speed was so fast a fleeting firing pass was made by the opposing fighters which resulted in one British pilot ditching in the sea, later to be rescued. Hurricanes of 32 Squadron tried to engage the Bf 109s of I./JG 2 and 64 Squadron also engaged. Two Bf 109s were shot down, one pilot was wounded and the other killed.

Radar detected a large build-up over the Cherbourg peninsula and Park ordered 609 and 1 Squadron up from Warmwell and Tangmere over Portland. Six other units from Middle Wallop and Exeter, Tangmere and Warmwell were ordered to readiness. Some 53 fighters were now involved, the Germans approached in strength in the late morning. Around 54 Ju 88s from I. and II./KG 54 were supported by 20 He 111s from KG 27; I. and II./ZG 2 provided 61 Bf 110s as escort which were reinforced by 30 Bf 109s from III./JG 2 under the command of Erich Mix and JG 27 provided withdrawal cover. It was the largest raid yet sent against a British target and within a minute of 10:04, 145, 152, 87, 213 and 238 Squadrons were scrambled to support the two airborne squadrons.

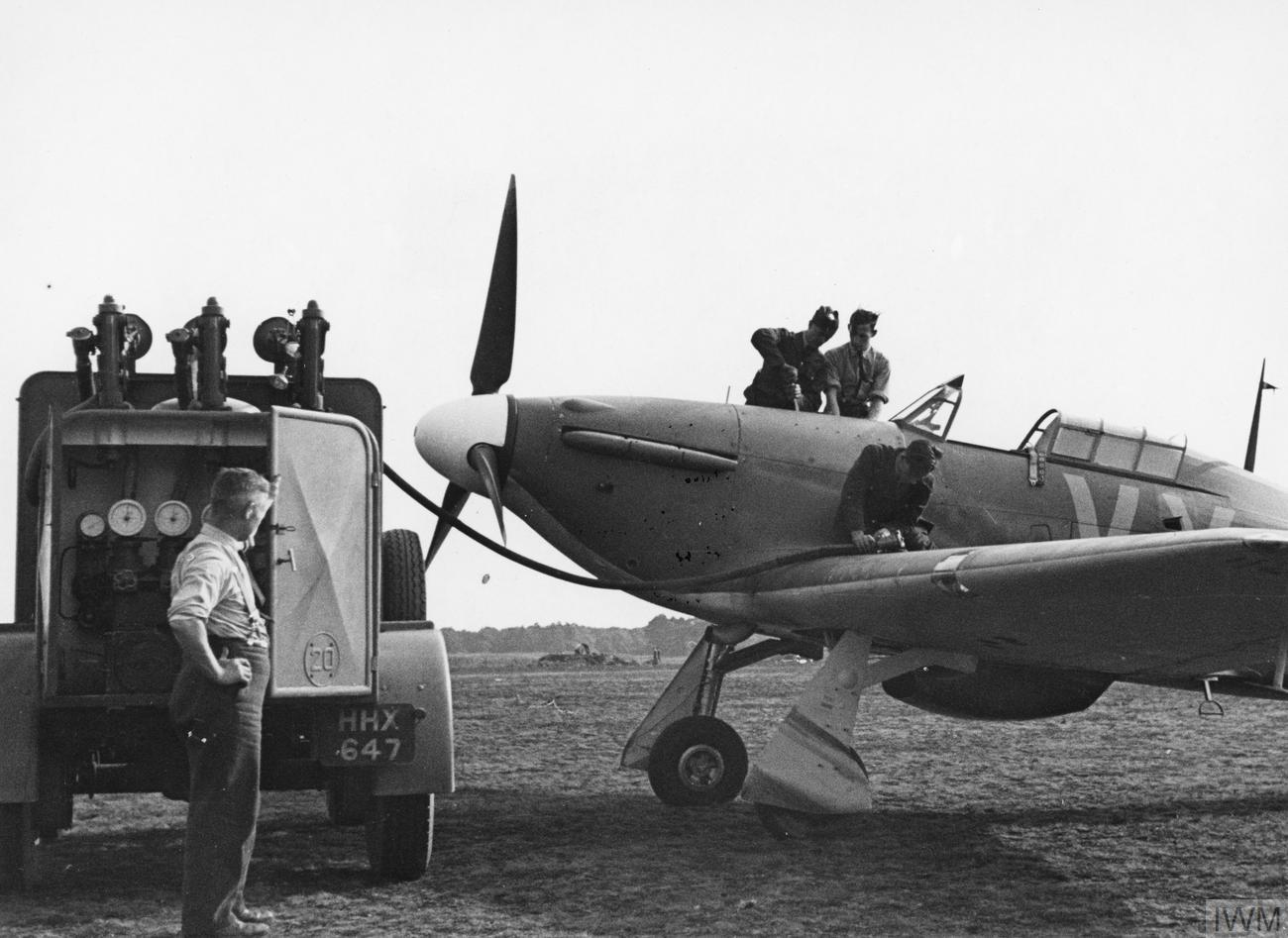
An 85 Squadron Hurricane, flown by Squadron Leader Peter Townsend at RAF Castle Camps, July 1940.

The Bf 109s and Bf 110s arrived ahead of the bombers and were engaged by 609 Squadron at 23,000 ft (7,000 m). Squadron leader Horace Darley led the Spitfires onto the flank of the Bf 110s and fired full-deflection shots which enabled his pilots to avoid the battery of forward-firing guns of the Bf 110s and shoot down five. Among the dead was Gruppenkommodore Major Ott, shot down by Noel Agazarian. Most of the British fighters became entangled with the escort, only four 152 Squadron Spitfires spotting the bombers as they headed for Portland and Weymouth. The He 111s bombed from 15,000 ft (4,600 m) while the Ju 88s dropped to 10,000 ft (3,000 m) and hit the oil storage tanks. The destroyers Scimitar and Skate were damaged in Portland. (Note: HMS Esk was damaged at Harwich and Windsor was damaged off Botany Buoy in the Thames estuary. Off the North Foreland in Kent, he armed trawler HMT Edwardian was run aground to prevent it sinking.) The trawler Peter Carey was severely damaged and SS Kirnwood (3,829 GRT) and tanker SS Oil Trader (5,550 GRT) were hit.

JG 27 covered the withdrawal of the bombers and lost three fighters to 238 and 145 squadrons for four 238 Squadron Hurricanes and four pilots killed while damaging another; 145 Squadron suffered two pilots killed, two Hurricanes destroyed and two damaged. The dogfight resulted in the loss of 16 Hurricanes with 13 pilots killed and two wounded. A 152 Squadron Spitfire was shot down and its pilot drowned. German losses were six Bf 110s, five Ju 88s, one He 111 and six Bf 109s. Both sides searched for survivors, two Blenheims from 604 Squadron covered by Spitfires of 152 Squadron scouted the Dover–Calais straits and found a He 59, protected by Bf 109s. The Spitfires held off the German fighters while the Blenheims destroyed the He 59; the Spitfires of 610 Squadron also caught and destroyed a He 59 but was attacked by Bf 109s and lost two aircraft and two pilots killed.

==== Convoy Booty ====
Rubensdörffer led ErpGr 210 and eight Dornier Do 17s from 9./KG 2, whose crews were low-level attack specialists. The Germans spotted Convoy Booty off the Harwich–Clacton coast at noon GMT. Twenty Bf 110s from ZG 26 provided high cover for the bombers but were intercepted by 11 Spitfires from 74 Squadron, Hurricanes of 85 Squadron and six Hurricanes from 17 Squadron. Three Bf 110s were shot down by 85 Squadron and the Hurricanes shot another down; two Bf 110s and three Do 17s were damaged. ZG 26 destroyed one Hurricane and damaged another from 17 Squadron killing one pilot. Two pilots from 74 Squadron were shot down and killed.

==== Convoys Agent and Arena ====
Another raid followed, to catch the British fighters when they were low on fuel. The second wave of 45 Do 17s and a Staffel of Ju 87s from II./StG 1 and IV./LG 1 arrived over the Thames Estuary to attack Convoy Agent and Convoy Arena, which were hugging the coast. The formation was protected by Bf 109s of JG 26 led by Adolf Galland; 111 and 74 Squadrons were scrambled, with Malan leading, who claimed a Bf 109 which crash-landed in France. One StG 1 Ju 87 also fell to his unit before the Bf 109s arrived. German records ascribe a 9./KG 4 Do 17 lost to Hurricanes but no corresponding claim can be found in British records; 111 Squadron lost four Hurricanes and one crash-landed; four pilots were killed, two believed drowned. The weather forced the Germans to curtail operations in the early afternoon and the lull lasted until the following morning with Adlertag. The raid sank two naval trawlers, HMT Tamarisk and Pyrope killing 12 seamen.

=== 12 August ===
On 12 August, Adlertag, the Germans began to bombard convoys with long-range artillery which had been emplaced at Cap Gris Nez to protect an invasion force. Coaster crews sailing past at 5–6 kn (9.3–11.1 km/h; 5.8–6.9 mph) found the bombardments highly stressful but none of the ships were hit. After the operations against Convoy CW 9, the Luftwaffe campaign moved against inland targets and though the coastal convoys remained vulnerable, the traffic continued. Losses to the Luftwaffe were only a small proportion of the 4,000,000 long tons (4,100,000 t) of shipping which sailed along the south coast during the Kanalkampf but at its peak it sank or damaged 1/3 of the ships off the south coast. Had losses continued at such a rate, it would have become impossible to find new crews for the ships. Stephen Roskill, the Royal Navy official historian, wrote in 1957, that the operations were costly for both sides; had the RAF failed to increase the convoy protection effort, the route might have been abandoned.

== Aftermath ==
=== Analysis ===
The Kanalkampf began the Battle of Britain; the Germans had needed time to establish airfields along the French and Belgian coasts for the air assault on south-east England, to link them to Luftwaffe communications systems and to replace the losses of May and June. Hitler and OKW were uncertain about how to proceed and attacking shipping was the only way for the Luftwaffe to engage Fighter Command. Hitler issued directive 16 on 16 July, for the preparation of an invasion fleet but Göring was against an invasion and failed to attend any of the conferences, to improve inter-service co-operation for a landing, before 1 August. Göring might still have believed that the British would negotiate and was content for the Channel battles to continue. On 19 July, Göring approved a directive to destroy British air power. Hitler issued Directive 17 on 1 August, intending the operation to be a prelude to invasion, which expanded the scope of Göring's directive. The campaign against the RAF was to begin around 5 August, depending on suitable weather.

Göring met his staff officers in The Hague, Netherlands on 1 August. Göring believed the inaccurate German intelligence dossiers from Abteilung 5, Luftwaffe Military Intelligence, led by Joseph Schmid, that the RAF was weak and could be defeated within days. Göring hoped that an aerial victory would encourage the British to sue for terms, which would preclude a risky cross-Channel invasion against the Royal Navy; Göring was confident the battle would be over quickly. In the second week of August, Luftflotten 2, 3 and 5, were ready to begin the assault on England proper. Operations over the Channel and against shipping lost importance as the air war intensified over English air bases.

In the British official "History of the Second World War" volume, The Defence of the United Kingdom (1957) Basil Collier called the German operations a failure, sinking only 30,000 GRT of shipping from the near 1,000,000 GRT of weekly coastal shipping in the Channel. In 34 days, Fighter Command flew more than 18,000 day sorties, a daily average of 530. Collier speculated that the daily sortie rate of the Luftwaffe was lower and that many flights were not connected with the Channel operations. The Luftwaffe still managed to outnumber the British fighters, that suffered 148 losses, almost half of these in three days during the second week in August. Collier put Luftwaffe losses at 286, most in operations over the Channel. The German loss of single- or twin-engined fighters was 105 and on the three days of high British losses in August (73) the Luftwaffe lost 100 aircraft. Collier wrote that German losses were nearly double the Fighter Command loss, for very few ships sunk. The British derived other unquantifiable benefits in lessons learned and that German strategy did not benefit "in any discoverable way".

=== Casualties ===
RAF and Luftwaffe aircraft losses 4 July – 11 August 1940
Loss	RAF	Luftwaffe
Shot down	115	215
Damaged	42	92
Total	157	307

In 1953, Denis Richards wrote that from 10 July to 10 August the RAF shot down 227 Luftwaffe aircraft for a loss of 96 fighters. In a 1969 publication, Francis Mason wrote that the Luftwaffe lost 201 airmen killed, 75 wounded, 277 missing and 16 taken prisoner, 80 fighters destroyed and 36 damaged, 22 Stuka dive bombers shot down and 22 damaged, 100 medium bomber losses and 33 damaged, 13 naval aircraft were destroyed and one damaged. Fifty-three Bf 109s were destroyed and 21 damaged, 27 Bf 110s were shot down and 15 damaged. Twenty-four Ju 88 medium bombers were shot down and ten damaged, 28 Do 17s were lost and 17 damaged, 33 He 111s destroyed and six damaged. Ten He 59 air-sea rescue aircraft were destroyed, one damaged and three He 115s were destroyed.

Four Kriegsmarine E-boats were damaged or sunk in Channel operations during 1940. Francis Mason listed 71 RAF pilots killed, 19 pilots wounded and 4 pilots missing; 115 fighters destroyed and 42 damaged, of which, 45 Spitfires were shot down, twenty were severely damaged and four were slightly damaged; 64 Hurricanes were lost, twelve were severely damaged and six lightly damaged; six Defiants were shot down, ten aircrew killed and two wounded. The Merchant Navy and neutral states lost 35 ships sunk along with seven fishing vessels and the Royal Navy lost four destroyers, with at least 176 sailors killed among c. 300 casualties.

=== Channel convoys, 1940 ===
CE and CW convoys in 1940
Convoy	No.	Ships	Losses	Stragglers	Other losses	Total	Notes
CE	14	198	–	–	–	Nil	
CW	19	352	13	3	3	19	

== Bibliography ==
- Baughen, G. (2016). The RAF in the Battle of France and the Battle of Britain: A Reappraisal of Army and Air Policy 1938–1940. Stroud: Fonthill Media. ISBN 978-1-78155-525-5.
- Bergström, Christer (2015). The Battle of Britain: An Epic Conflict Revisited. Oxford: Casemate. ISBN 978-1612-00347-4.
- Bertke, Donald A.; Kindell, Don; Smith, Gordon (2009). World War II Sea War: France Falls, Britain Stands Alone: Day-to-Day Naval Actions from April 1940 through September 1940. Dayton, OH: Bertke. ISBN 978-0-578-02941-2.
- Bishop, Ian (2010). Battle of Britain: A Day-to-Day Chronicle, 10 July – 31 October 1940. London: Quercus. ISBN 978-1-84916-989-9.
- Breffort, Dominique; Jouineau, Andre (2009). Messerschmitt Me 110: From 1939 to 1945, Messerschmitt's Twin-engined fighters Bf 110, Me 210 and 410. Paris: Histoire and Collections. ISBN 978-2-35250-144-2.
- Bungay, Stephen (2000). The Most Dangerous Enemy: A History of the Battle of Britain. London: Aurum Press. ISBN 978-1-85410-721-3.
- Caldwell, Donald L. (1998). The JG 26 War Diary: 1943–1945. Vol. II. London: Grub Street. ISBN 978-1-898697-86-2.
- Collier, B. (2004) [1957]. Butler, J. R. M. (ed.). The Defence of the United Kingdom. History of the Second World War United Kingdom Military Series (facs. repr. pbk. Naval & Military Press ed.). London: HMSO. ISBN 978-1-845-74055-9.
- Cooksley, Peter (1983). 1940: The Story of No. 11 Group, Fighter Command. London: Hale. ISBN 978-0-7090-0907-8.
- Cull, Brian (2013). First of the Few: 5 June – July 1940. Stroud: Fonthill Media. ISBN 978-1-78155-116-5.
- Cull, Brian (2017). Battle for the Channel: The First Month of the Battle of Britain 10 July – 10 August 1940. Stroud: Fonthill Media. ISBN 978-1-78155-625-2.
- de Zeng, H. L.; Stankey, D.G.; Creek, E. J. (2009). Dive-Bomber and Ground-Attack Units of the Luftwaffe, 1933–1945: A Reference Source. Vol. I. Ian Allan. ISBN 978-1-9065-3708-1.
- Donnelly, Larry (2004). The Other Few: Bomber and Coastal Command Operations in the Battle of Britain. Walton on Thames: Red Kite. ISBN 978-0-9546201-2-7.
- Evans, Arthur (2010). Destroyer Down: An Account of HM Destroyer Losses 1939–1945. London: Pen and Sword. ISBN 978-1-84884-270-0 – via Archive Foundation.
- Foreman, John (2003). Fighter Command Victory Claims of World War II: 1939 to 1940. Walton on Thames, Surrey: Red Kite. ISBN 978-0-9538061-8-8.
- Goss, Christopher (2000). The Luftwaffe Bombers' Battle of Britain. Manchester: Crecy. ISBN 0-947554-82-3.
- Goodrum, Alastair (2005). No Place for Chivalry: RAF Night Fighters Defend the East of England Against the German Air Force in Two World Wars. London: Grub Street. ISBN 978-1-904943-22-8.
- Hague, Arnold (2000). The Allied Convoy System, 1939–1945: Its Organization, Defence and Operation. Annapolis, MD: Naval Institute Press. ISBN 978-1-55750-019-9.
- Hewitt, Nick (2008). Coastal Convoys 1939–1945: The Indestructible Highway. Barnsley: Pen & Sword Maritime. ISBN 978-1-84415-861-4.
- Hinsley, F. H. (1994) [1993]. British Intelligence in the Second World War. Its influence on Strategy and Operations (abridged). History of the Second World War (2nd rev. ed.). London: HMSO. ISBN 978-0-11-630961-7.
- Hooton, E. R. (2010). The Luftwaffe: A Study in Air Power 1933–1945. London: Chevron/Ian Allan. ISBN 978-1-906537180.
- Hooton, E. R. (1994). Phoenix Triumphant; The Rise and Rise of the Luftwaffe. London: Arms & Armour Press. ISBN 978-1-85409-181-9.
- Hooton, E. R. (1997). Eagle in Flames: The Fall of the Luftwaffe. London: Arms & Armour Press. ISBN 978-1-86019-995-0.
- Hyde, Hugh Montgomery (1976). British Air Policy Between the Wars, 1918–1939. London: Heineman. ISBN 978-0-434-47983-2.
- Isby, David (2005). The Luftwaffe and the War at Sea, 1939–1945. London: Chatham. ISBN 978-1-86176-256-6.
- James, T. C. G.; Cox, Sebastian (2000). The Battle of Britain. London: Frank Cass. ISBN 978-0-7146-8149-8 – via Archive Foundation.
- Jordan, Roger W. (2006) [1999]. The World's Merchant Fleets 1939: The Particulars and Wartime Fates of 6,000 Ships (2nd ed.). London: Chatham/Lionel Leventhal. ISBN 978-1-86176-293-1.
- Mackay, Ron (2000). Messerschmitt Bf 110. Wiltshire: The Crowood Press. ISBN 1-86126-313-9.
- Mason, Francis (1969). Battle Over Britain. London: McWhirter Twins. ISBN 978-0-901928-00-9.
- Murray, Williamson (1983). Strategy for Defeat. The Luftwaffe 1935–1945. Princeton, New Jersey: University Press of the Pacific. ISBN 978-0-89875-797-2.
- Neitzel, Sönke (2003). Kriegsmarine and Luftwaffe Co-operation in the War against Britain, 1939–1945. War in History. Vol. 10. pp. 448–463. doi:10.1191/0968344503wh285oa. ISSN 0968-3445. S2CID 159960697.
- North, Richard (2012). The Many Not The Few: The Stolen History of the Battle of Britain. London: Continuum. ISBN 978-1-4411-3151-5.
- Orange, Vincent (2011). Dowding of Fighter Command and the Battle of Britain. London: Grub Street. ISBN 978-1-906502-72-0.
- Parker, Nigel (2013). A Documentary History of Every Enemy Aircraft Brought Down Over the United Kingdom, September 1939 – 14 August 1940. Luftwaffe Crash Archive. Vol. 1. Walton on Thames: Red Kite. ISBN 978-1-906592-09-7.
- Ray, John (2009). The Battle of Britain: Dowding and the First Victory, 1940. London: Cassel Military Paperbacks. ISBN 978-1-4072-2131-1.
- Richards, Denis (1974) [1953]. The Fight At Odds. Royal Air Force 1939–1945. London: HMSO. ISBN 978-0-11-771592-9.
- Robinson, Anthony (1987). RAF Fighter Squadrons in the Battle of Britain. London: Weidenfeld Military. ISBN 978-0-85368-846-4.
- Rohwer, Jürgen; Hümmelchen, Gerhard (2005) [1972]. Chronology of the War at Sea, 1939–1945: The Naval History of World War Two (3rd rev. ed.). London: Chatham. ISBN 978-1-86176-257-3.
- Roskill, S. W. (1957) [1954]. Butler, J. R. M (ed.). War at Sea. History of the Second World War United Kingdom Military Series. Vol. I (4th impr. ed.). London: HMSO. OCLC 881709135 – via HyperWar Project.
- Saunders, Andy (2010). Convoy Peewit: August 8, 1940: The First Day of the Battle of Britain?. London: Grub Street. ISBN 978-1-906502-67-6.
- Saunders, Andy (2013). Stuka Attack! The Dive-Bombing Assault on England During the Battle of Britain. London: Grub Street. ISBN 978-1-908117-35-9.
- Shores, Christopher (1985). Duel for the Sky: Ten Crucial Battles of World War II. London: Grub Street. ISBN 978-0-7137-1601-6.
- Smith, Peter (2007). Naval Warfare in the English Channel: 1939–1945. London: Pen and Sword. ISBN 978-1-844155-804.
- The Rise and Fall of the German Air Force Air 41/10. Public Record Office War Histories No 248 (repr. ed.). Richmond, Surrey: Air Ministry. 2001 [1948]. ISBN 978-1-903365-30-4.
- Trevor-Roper, Hugh (2004). Hitler's War Directives; 1939–1945. Edinburgh: Birlinn. ISBN 978-1-84341-014-0.
- Ward, John (2004). Hitler's Stuka Squadrons: The Ju 87 at War, 1936–1945. London: Eagles of War. ISBN 1-86227-246-8.
- Weal, John (1997). Junkers Ju 87 Stukageschwader 1937–41. Oxford: Osprey. ISBN 978-1-85532-636-1.
- Weal, John (2007). Jagdgeschwader 53 'Pik-As'. Oxford: Osprey. ISBN 978-1-84603-204-2.
- Williamson, Gordon (2011). E-Boat vs. MTB: The English Channel 1941–45. Oxford: Osprey. ISBN 978-1-84908-406-2.
