= Royal Naval Cemetery =

Cemetery in Dorset, England

Coordinates: 50.5654°N 2.4366°W

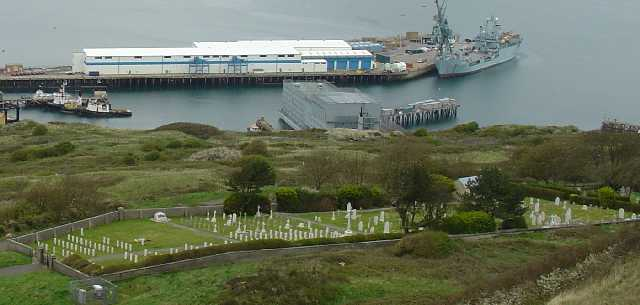
The Royal Naval Cemetery and Portland Harbour seen from the Verne Citadel entrance.

Royal Naval Cemetery (once known as Naval and Military Cemetery) is a cemetery on the Isle of Portland, Dorset, England. The site overlooks Portland Harbour, and is found below the main entrance to the Verne Citadel (HM Prison The Verne). As the name suggests, the graveyard holds deceased servicemen and officers of Portland's Royal Navy which was stationed at the island until 1995. The cemetery holds 140 identified casualties in total to date, and is owned by the Ministry of Defence. There are other cemeteries designated the "Royal Naval Cemetery" at various other locations associated with the Royal Navy, such as the Royal Naval Cemetery (sometimes also referred to as The Glade) on the island of Ireland, location of the Royal Naval Dockyard in the Imperial fortress British Overseas Territory of Bermuda (yet other cemeteries have similar designations, such as Royal Navy Burying Ground, in Halifax, Nova Scotia).

The cemetery was first laid out during the 19th century. With the establishment of a naval base at Portland Harbour, and the Verne Citadel fortification, a number of fatalities began to occur. Burials of World War I (1914–1918) total 65, where 5 remain unidentified. The majority of World War II (1939–1945) graves are together in the Church of England section, near the Cross of Sacrifice. Of the buried, 10 are unidentified, whilst there are burials for 1 Norwegian Merchant Navy seaman and 12 German airmen. The cemetery remains well looked after to date and features a small amount of newer burials of recently deceased servicemen.

== Burials and memorials ==
Seaman Jack Foreman Mantle is buried at the cemetery, a Leading Seaman who was killed on 4 July 1940 during a German air raid on HMS Foylebank which was berthed in Portland's harbour at the time. Although mortally wounded, Mantle manned the starboard 20mm pom-pom gun until he died which earned himself a posthumous Victoria Cross for his actions. This was only the second occasion that the Victoria Cross has been awarded for action in the United Kingdom.

The victims of the 1957 HMS Sidon torpedo explosion are found in the cemetery. The event occurred in Portland's harbour with the loss of 13 lives after a faulty torpedo sank the submarine.

== See also ==
- Canadian war cemeteries
