= HMS Foylebank =

1930 cargo ship converted to anti-aircraft role

Coordinates: 50°34′37″N 2°25′10″W

History

United Kingdom
- Name: MV Foylebank
- Operator: Bank Line (Andrew Weir Shipping)
- Builder: Harland & Wolff, Belfast, Northern Ireland
- Launched: 12 June 1930
- Fate: Requisitioned by Royal Navy September 1939

History

United Kingdom
- Name: HMS Foylebank
- Namesake: Previous name retained
- Operator: Royal Navy
- Acquired: September 1939
- Commissioned: 6 June 1940
- Fate: Sunk 5 July 1940

General characteristics
- Displacement: 5,582 tons
- Propulsion: 2 diesel engines, 16 cylinders, two screws
- Speed: 11 knots (20 km/h; 13 mph)
- Complement: 290–300
- Armament: 4 twin high-angle 4-inch (102 mm) turrets; 2 quadruple 2-pounder pom-pom mounts; 2 quadruple .5-inch (12.7 mm) machine guns

HMS Foylebank was a Royal Navy anti-aircraft ship active during the early part of the Second World War. She entered service in June 1940 and was sunk in a German air attack in July 1940.

== Service history ==
Foylebank was launched on 12 June 1930 as the 5,500-gross register ton motor merchant ship MV Foylebank for the Bank Line (Andrew Weir Shipping) and requisitioned by the Royal Navy when the Second World War broke out in September 1939. She was converted into an anti-aircraft ship, equipped with 0.5 inch (12.7 mm) machine guns, two quad 2-pounder pom-poms and four twin high-angle 4-inch (102 mm) gun turrets. Commissioned as HMS Foylebank on 6 June 1940, with Captain Henry P. Wilson in command, she arrived in Portland Harbour next to the Isle of Portland in Dorset, England, on 9 June 1940 for a work-up for anti-aircraft duties. She subsequently saw action at Portland.

On 4 July 1940 whilst the majority of her crew were at breakfast, unidentified aircraft were reported to the south. These were originally thought to be Allied aircraft returning to base but they turned out to be 26 Luftwaffe Junkers Ju 87 Stuka dive bombers. These aircraft had the objective of disabling Foylebank, which the Germans saw as a threat to their plans to destroy the United Kingdom's coastal shipping. During an eight-minute attack, Foylebank shot down two aircraft, but an estimated 22 bombs hit the ship and she listed to port, shrouded in smoke, with 176 out of a total crew of 298 killed and many more wounded.. She sank on 5 July 1940. One of the ship's company, Jack Foreman Mantle, was posthumously awarded the Victoria Cross for his actions in defending the ship from aircraft whilst mortally wounded.

== Salvage ==
Foylebank later was salvaged in two sections. The forward section was broken up at Falmouth, Cornwall, in 1947, the aft section at Thos. W. Ward Grays in Essex in 1952. Some fragments remain on the seabed and one piece has been recovered and presented to the Portland Museum in Dorset.
