= Jack Mantle =

Royal Navy sailor

Jack Foreman Mantle
- Born: 12 April 1917; Wandsworth, London, England
- Died: 4 July 1940 (aged 23); HMS Foylebank, Portland Harbour, Portland, England
- Burial place: Royal Naval Cemetery, Portland
- Military career
- Allegiance: United Kingdom
- Branch: Royal Navy
- Service years: 1933–1940
- Rank: Leading Seaman
- Service number: P/JX 139070
- Units: HMS Foylebank
- Conflicts: Second World War: Home Front; Sinking of HMS Foylebank (DOW)
- Awards: Victoria Cross; Mentioned in Despatches

Jack Foreman Mantle, VC (12 April 1917 – 4 July 1940) was a sailor in the Royal Navy and a recipient of the Victoria Cross, the highest award for gallantry in the face of the enemy that can be awarded to British and Commonwealth forces. The award was made after Mantle had continued to operate his anti-aircraft gun during an air raid, despite being fatally wounded.

== Early life ==
Born in Wandsworth, London, on 12 April 1917, Mantle was educated at Taunton's School in Southampton. He joined the Royal Navy at the age of 16 and early in the Second World War, was mentioned in dispatches for shooting down an enemy aircraft.

== Victoria Cross ==
Mantle was 23 years old and an acting leading seaman, when the action for which he was awarded the Victoria Cross took place during an air raid on Portland Harbour. His citation in the London Gazette reads:

Leading Seaman Jack Mantle was in charge of the Starboard pom-pom when FOYLEBANK was attacked by enemy aircraft on the 4th of July, 1940. Early in the action his left leg was shattered by a bomb, but he stood fast at his gun and went on firing with hand-gear only; for the ship's electric power had failed. Almost at once he was wounded again in many places. Between his bursts of fire he had time to reflect on the grievous injuries of which he was soon to die; but his great courage bore him up till the end of the fight, when he fell by the gun he had so valiantly served.

The recommendation for the decoration was approved by Admiral Sir William James, the Commander-in-Chief, Portsmouth and was presented to his parents, John and Jeannie Mantle, by King George VI at Buckingham Palace in June 1941. It is the only occasion that the Victoria Cross has been awarded for action in British territorial waters. Mantle is buried at the Royal Naval Cemetery on the Isle of Portland, in the Church of England Portion, Grave 672.

== Legacy ==
The Yeovil Sea Cadet unit carries the name T. S. Mantle V. C. in his honour, and holds his Victoria Cross medal on display at their unit.

A brass memorial detailing the incident and honouring Mantle can be found in Southampton Maritime Museum. It is placed to the left of the main entrance doors. This memorial was originally situated in 'Jack's Corner' at the City's Central Sports Centre – the name remains as a children's play area.

An inscribed stone tablet in memory of Mantle is at the Nothe Fort in Weymouth. It was unveiled in June 1987 at the 11th reunion of Foylebank Association.

In 2021, Mantle was remembered in the form of a new, permanent Portland stone memorial plinth, plaque and bench, overlooking Chesil Beach. This is situated opposite the Heights Hotel, Portland, Dorset.
