= War grave =

Burial place

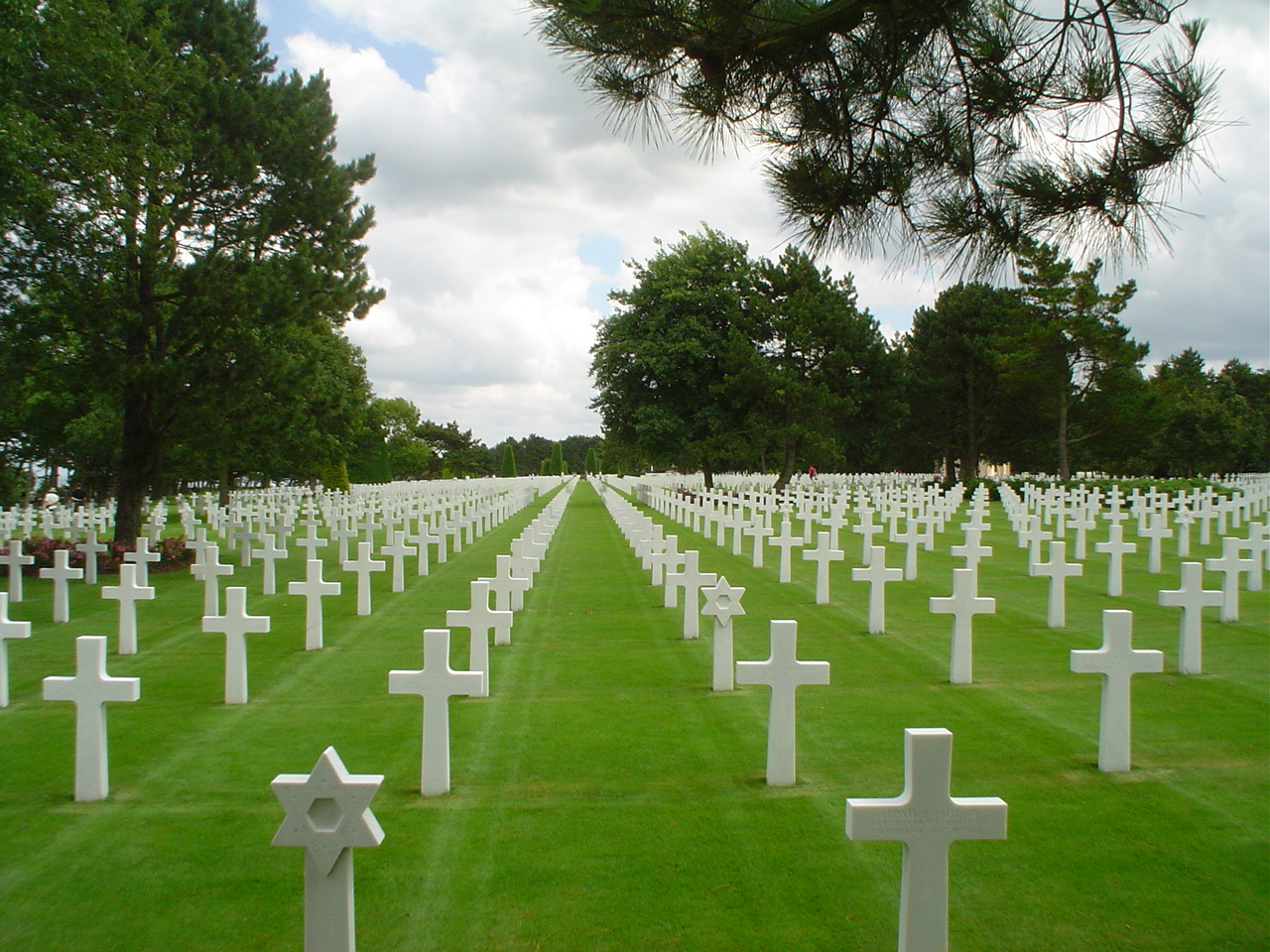
Normandy American Cemetery in 2003.

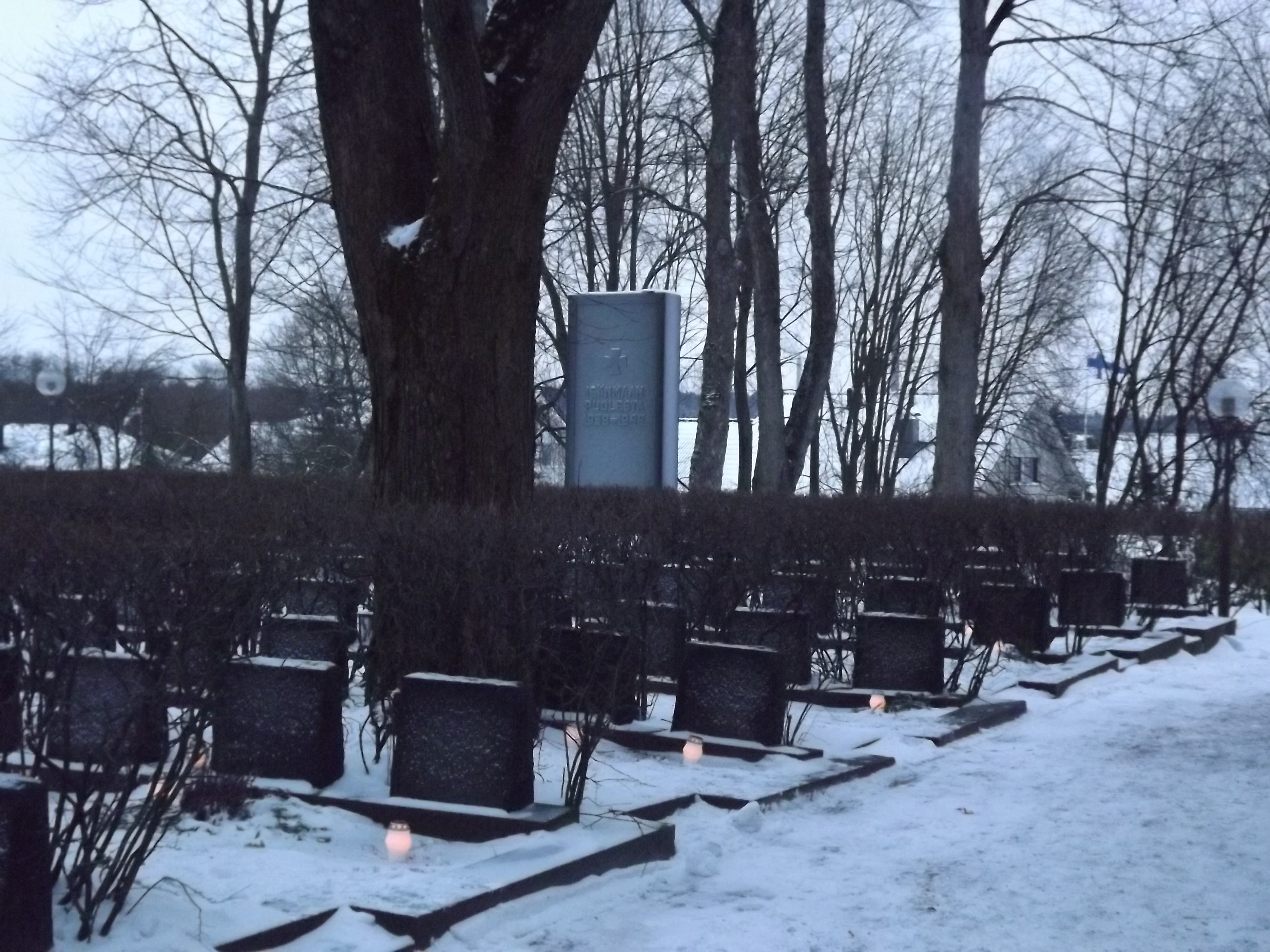
War graves at the St. Mary's Church in Turku, Finland.

A war grave is a burial place for members of the armed forces or civilians who died during military campaigns or operations.

== Definition ==
War grave applies not only to terrestrial graves: ships sunk during wartime are often considered to be war graves, as are military aircraft that crash into water; this is particularly true if crewmen perished inside the vehicle. Classification of a war grave is not limited to the occupier's death in combat but includes military personnel who die while in active service: for example, during the Crimean War, more military personnel died of disease than as a result of enemy action.

A common difference between cemeteries of war graves and those of civilian peacetime graves is the uniformity of those interred. They generally died during a relatively short period, in a small geographic area and consist of service members from the few military units involved. When it comes to the two World Wars, the large number of casualties means that the war graves can take up very large areas. For example, the Brookwood Military Cemetery in the UK is the largest of its kind in the country, with graves for more than 1,600 servicemen from the First World War and over 3,400 from the Second World War and covering an area of 15 hectares (37 acres). By contrast, Finnish war graves are generally small because the Finnish government decided following the Second World War that every dead soldier or service person would be returned to their home parish, meaning that virtually all Finnish churchyards contain a war grave.

== Jurisdiction ==
=== Australia ===
In Australia, the Office of Australian War Graves controls the maintenance of war cemeteries, plots, individual graves, post-war commemorations and battle exploit memorials.

=== Commonwealth ===
In the Commonwealth of Nations, the Commonwealth War Graves Commission is responsible for the commemoration of 1.7 million deceased Commonwealth military service members at over 23,000 separate burial sites in 153 countries. It operates through the financial support of six member states (United Kingdom, Canada, Australia, New Zealand, India and South Africa).

=== United Kingdom ===
In the United Kingdom, 67 ship wrecks and all underwater military aircraft are "protected places" under the Protection of Military Remains Act 1986 which imposes restrictions on their exploration and marine salvage.

=== Spain ===
In Spain, war graves are protected by the Law 60/1962.

=== United States ===
In the United States, war graves are managed within the United States National Cemetery System and American Battle Monuments Commission.

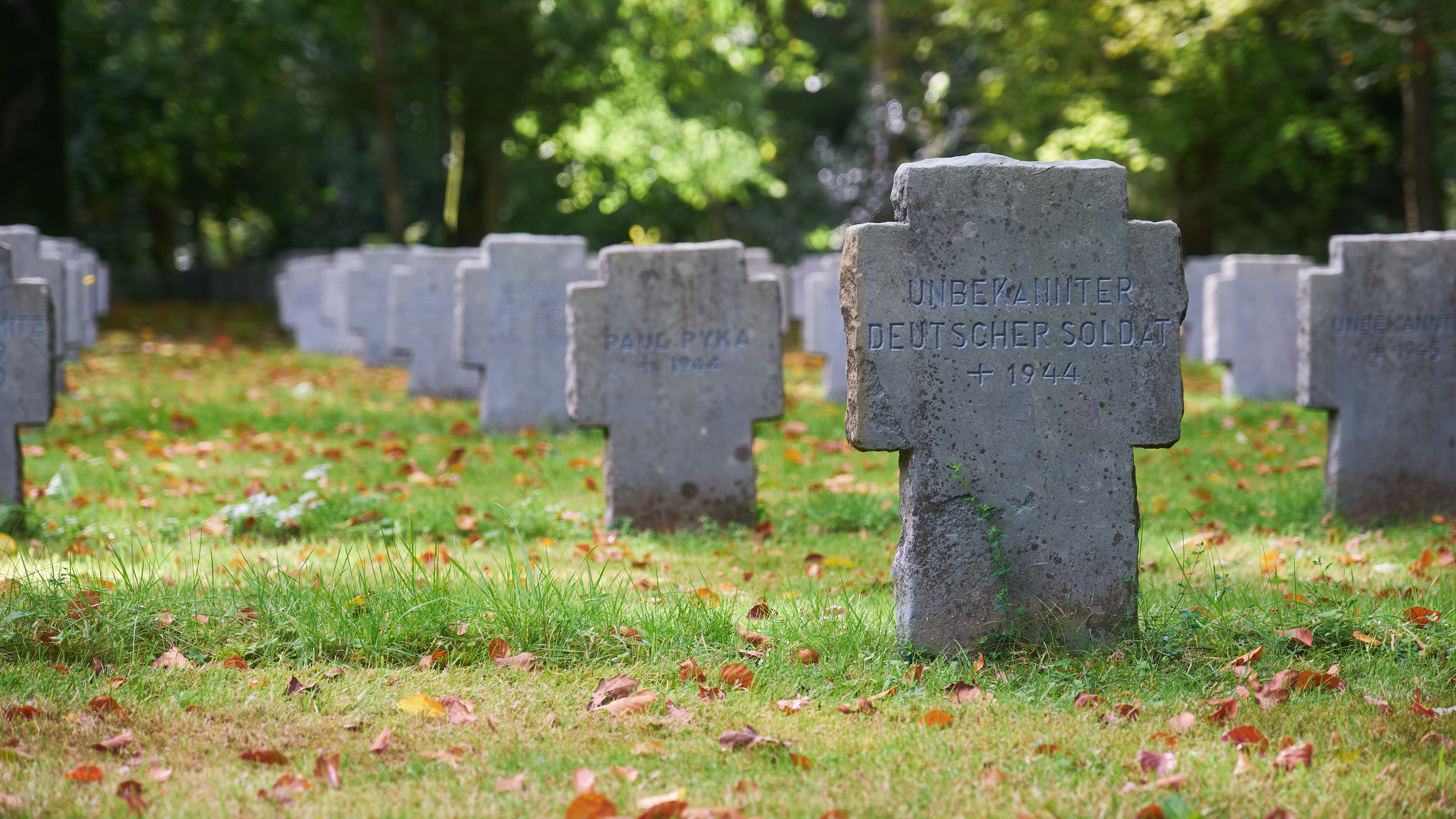
Grave of an unknown soldier at the forest cemetery in Aachen, Germany

=== Germany ===
In Germany the state is responsible for the war graves. In addition to soldiers, victims of Nazi Germany and the GDR also fall under the definition of "war grave". Abroad, the German War Graves Commission (Volksbund deutscher Kriegsgräberfürsorge) takes over the care of German war dead. War graves are under legal protection and have permanent resting rights. The war grave sites are mostly integrated in civil cemeteries and can be found on almost all graveyards.

== In popular culture ==
Rupert Brooke's 1914 poem, The Soldier – "If I should die, think only this of me: / That there's some corner of a foreign field / That is for ever England", is a patriotic poem about the possibility of dying abroad during a war. Brooke is himself buried in a war grave on Skyros in the Aegean Sea, having died while en route to fight in the Gallipoli Campaign.

The War Graves Photographic Project, founded in 2008, aims to create an archive of names and photographs of all military graves and memorials from 1914 to the present day from any nationality, although with a focus on Commonwealth soldiers.

== Gallery ==
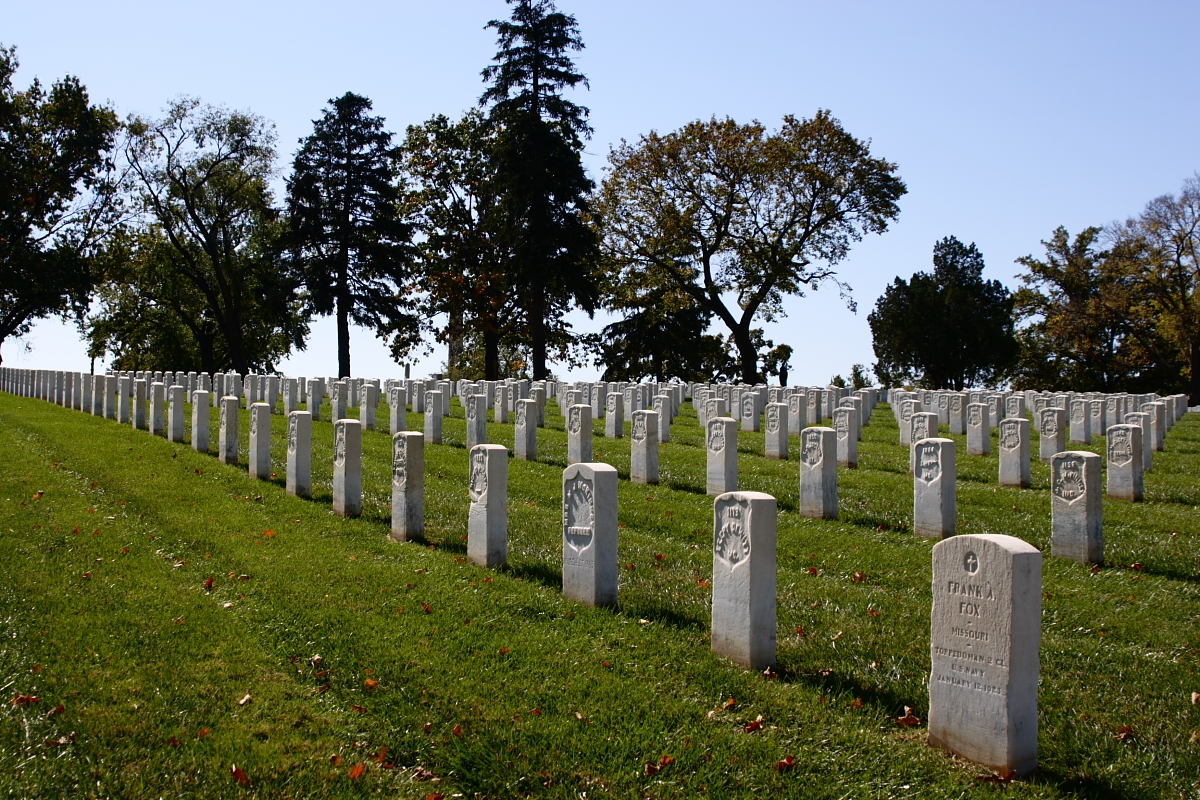
American Civil War graves, Jefferson Barracks National Cemetery

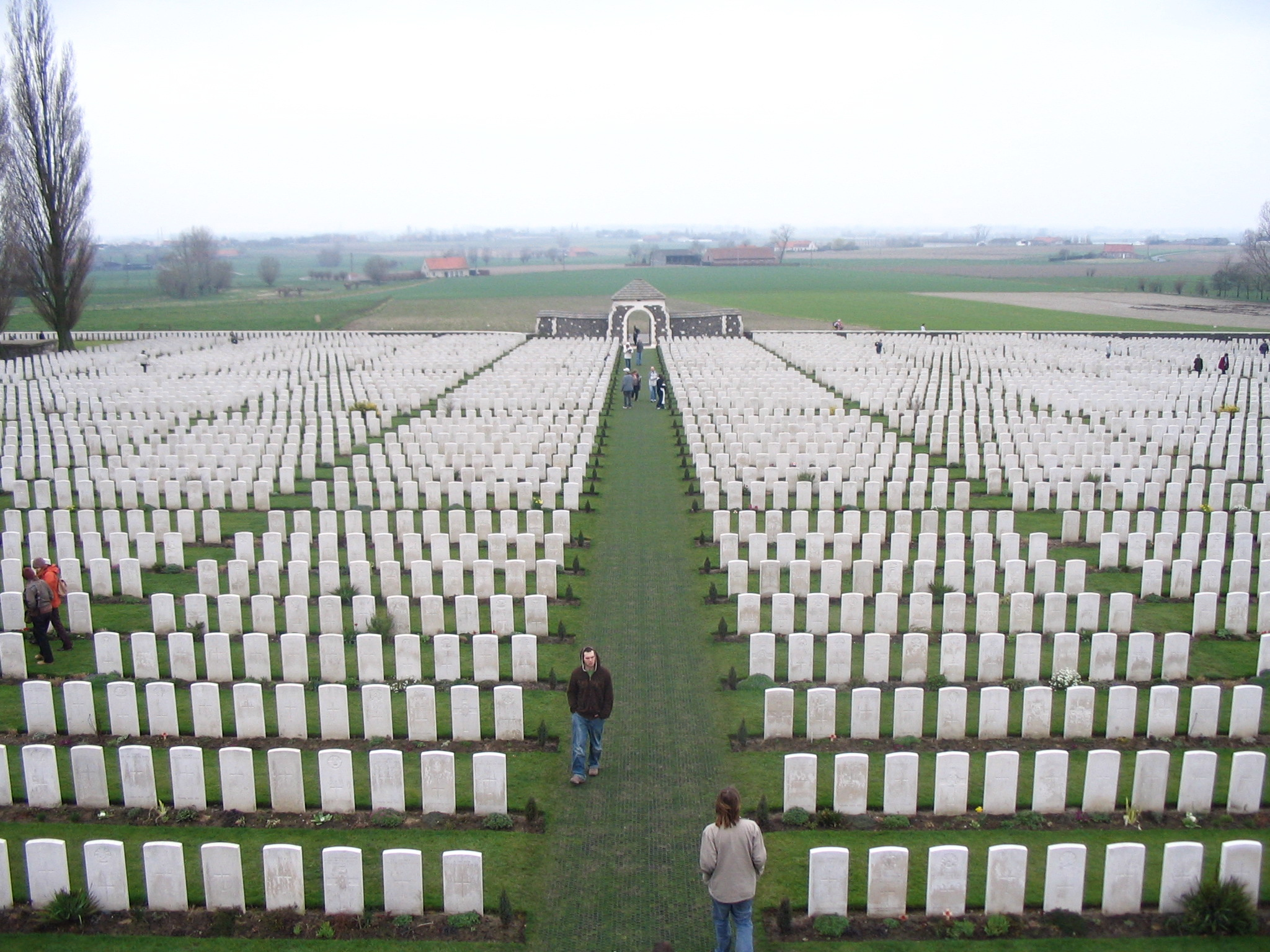
A CWGC cemetery from the First World War: Tyne Cot in the Ypres Salient

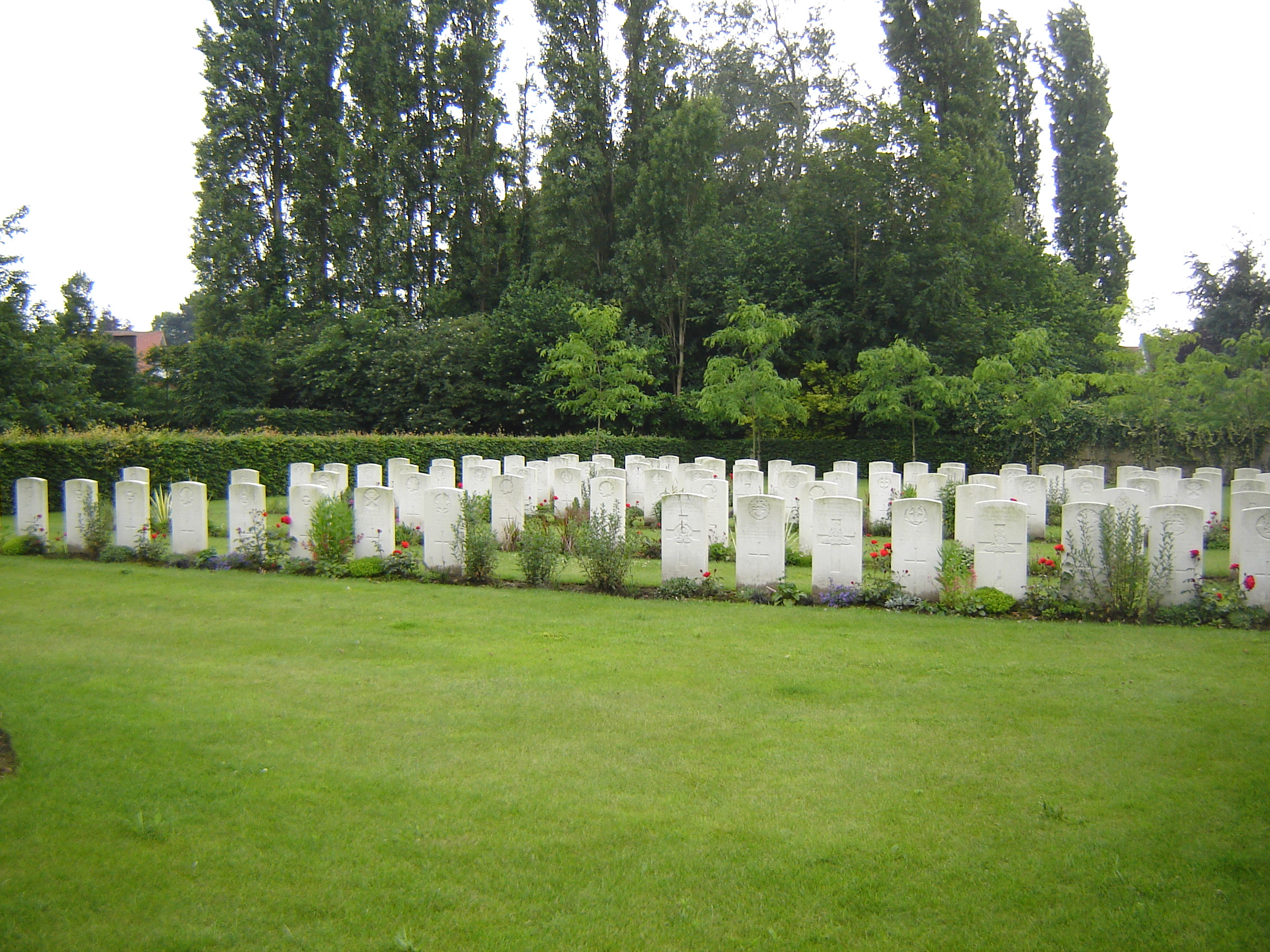
Moorseele Military Cemetery from the First world War in Moorsele, Belgium

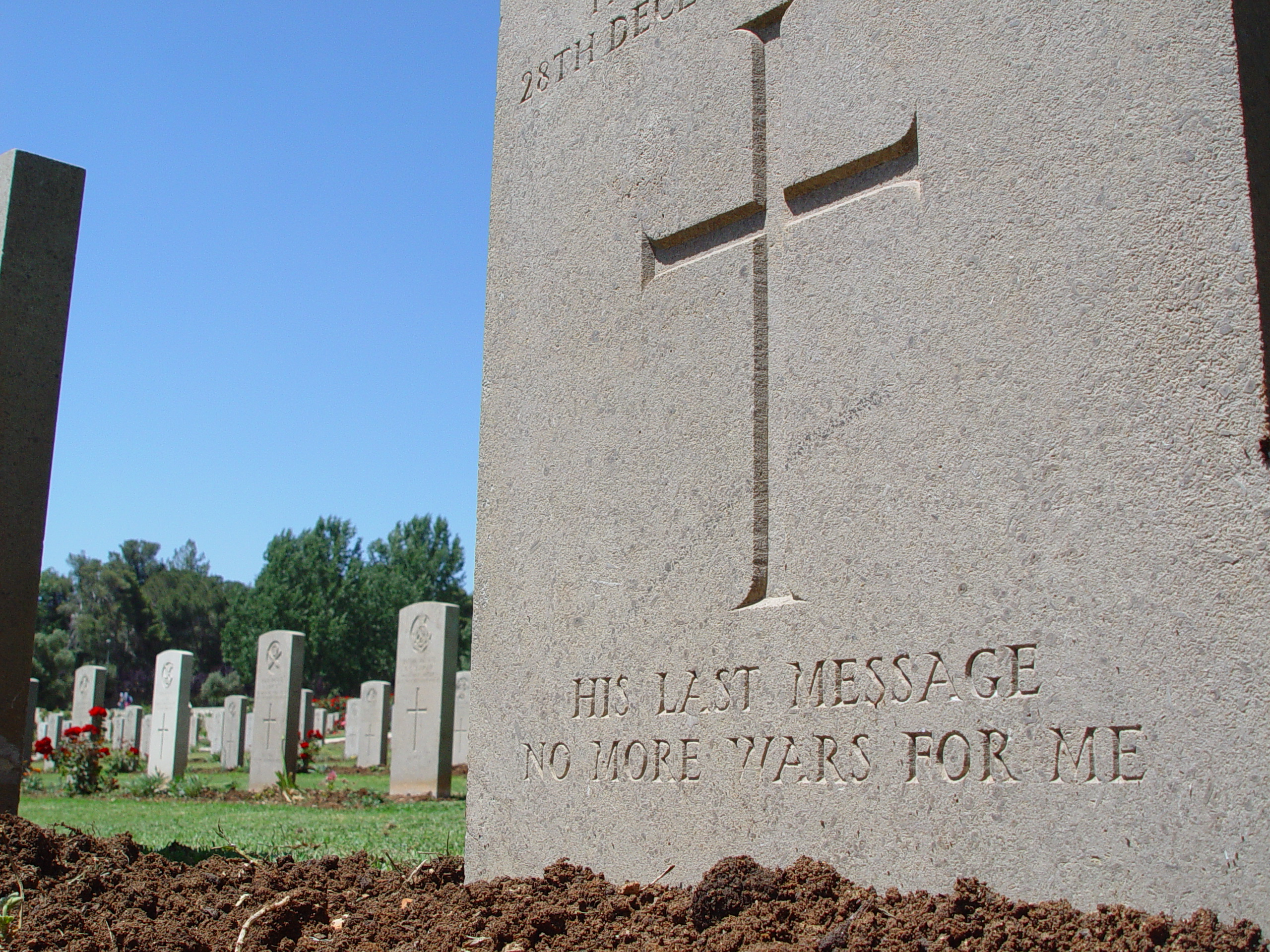
His last message: No more wars for me – A headstone in the Jerusalem British war cemetery

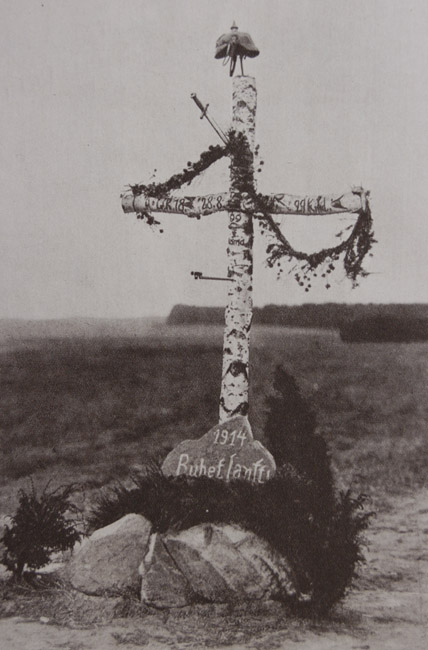
German World War I war grave on the eastern front.

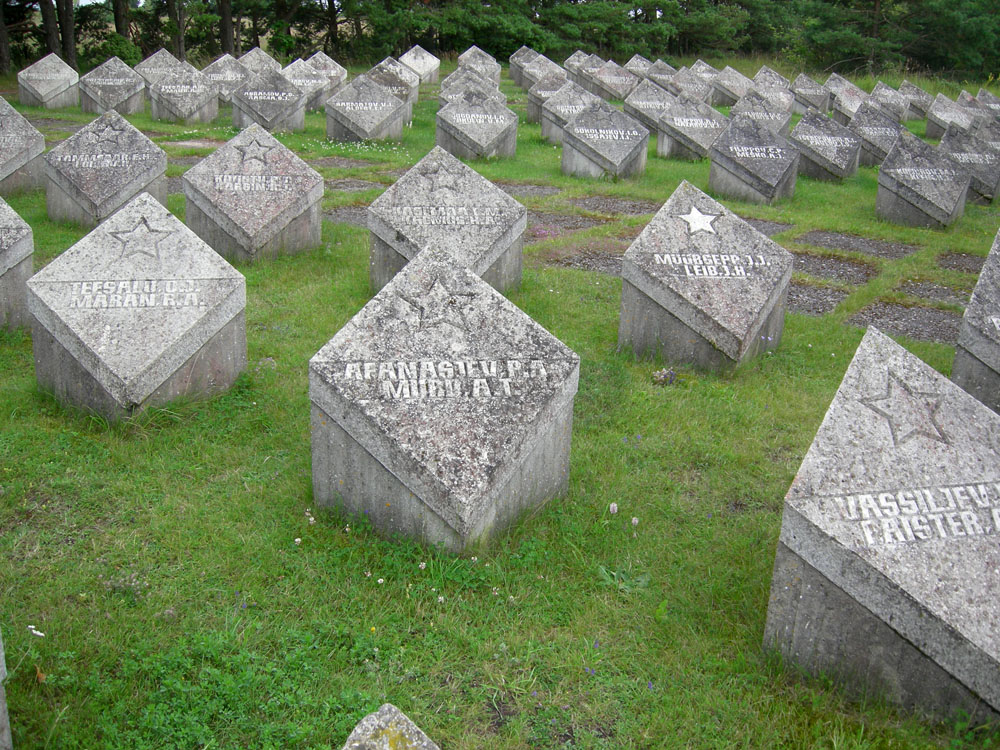
Former Soviet World War II graves, Tehumardi, Saaremaa, Estonia, removed by Estonian authorities in 2024

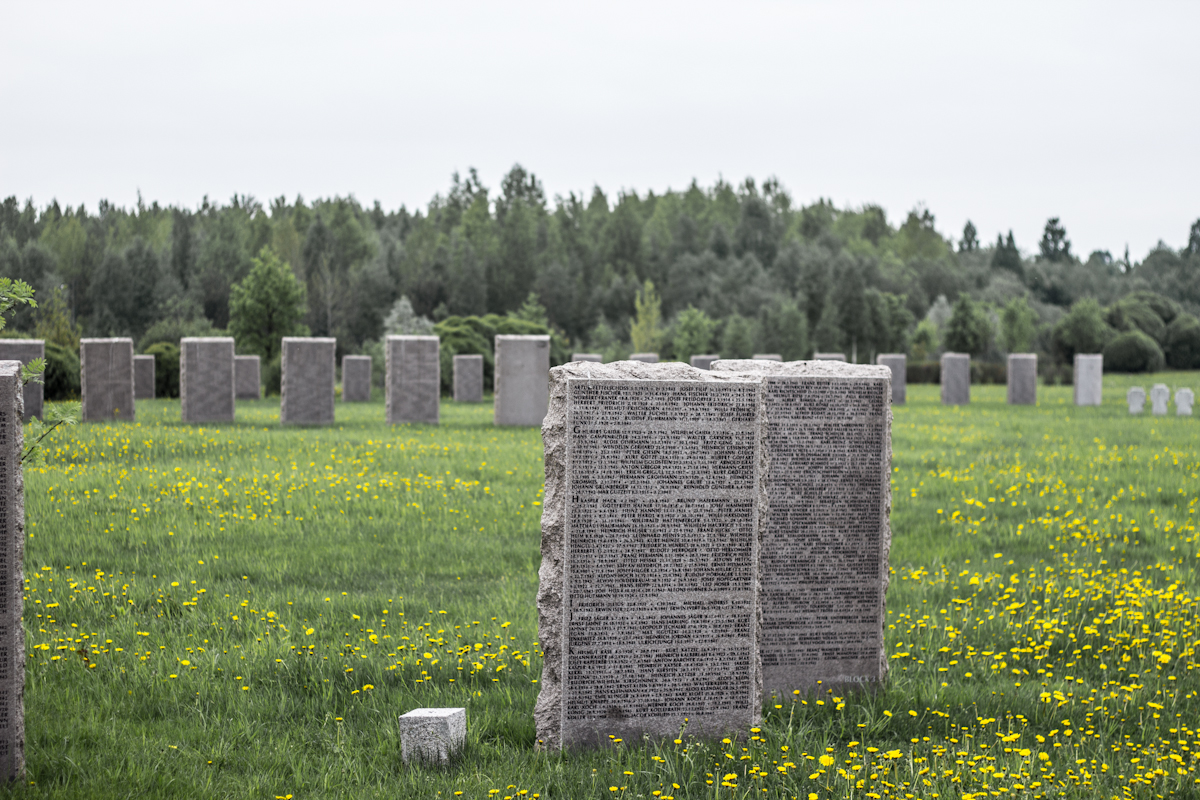
German World War II graves, Sologubovka, Russia

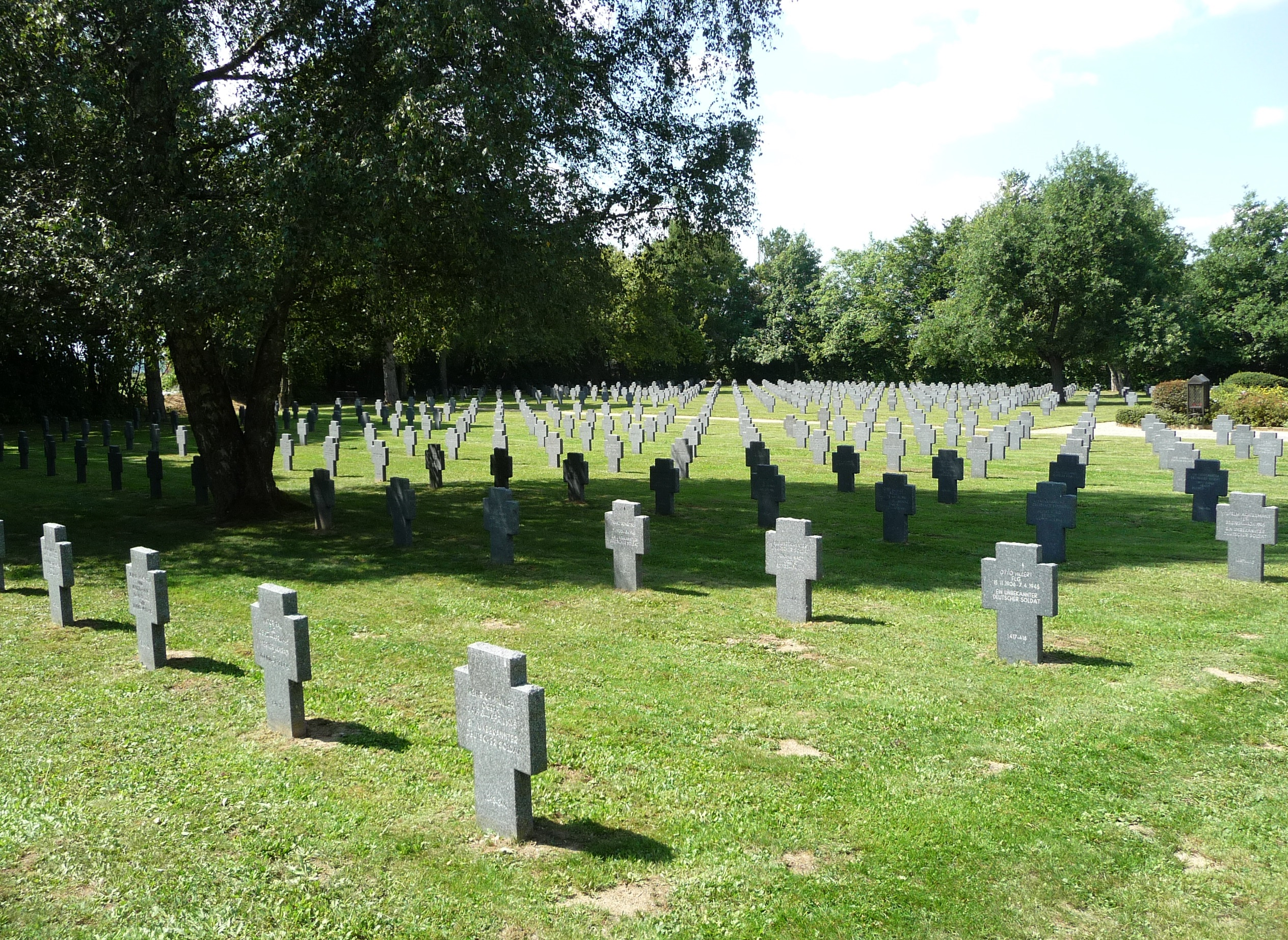
Allentsteig War Cemetery, Austria

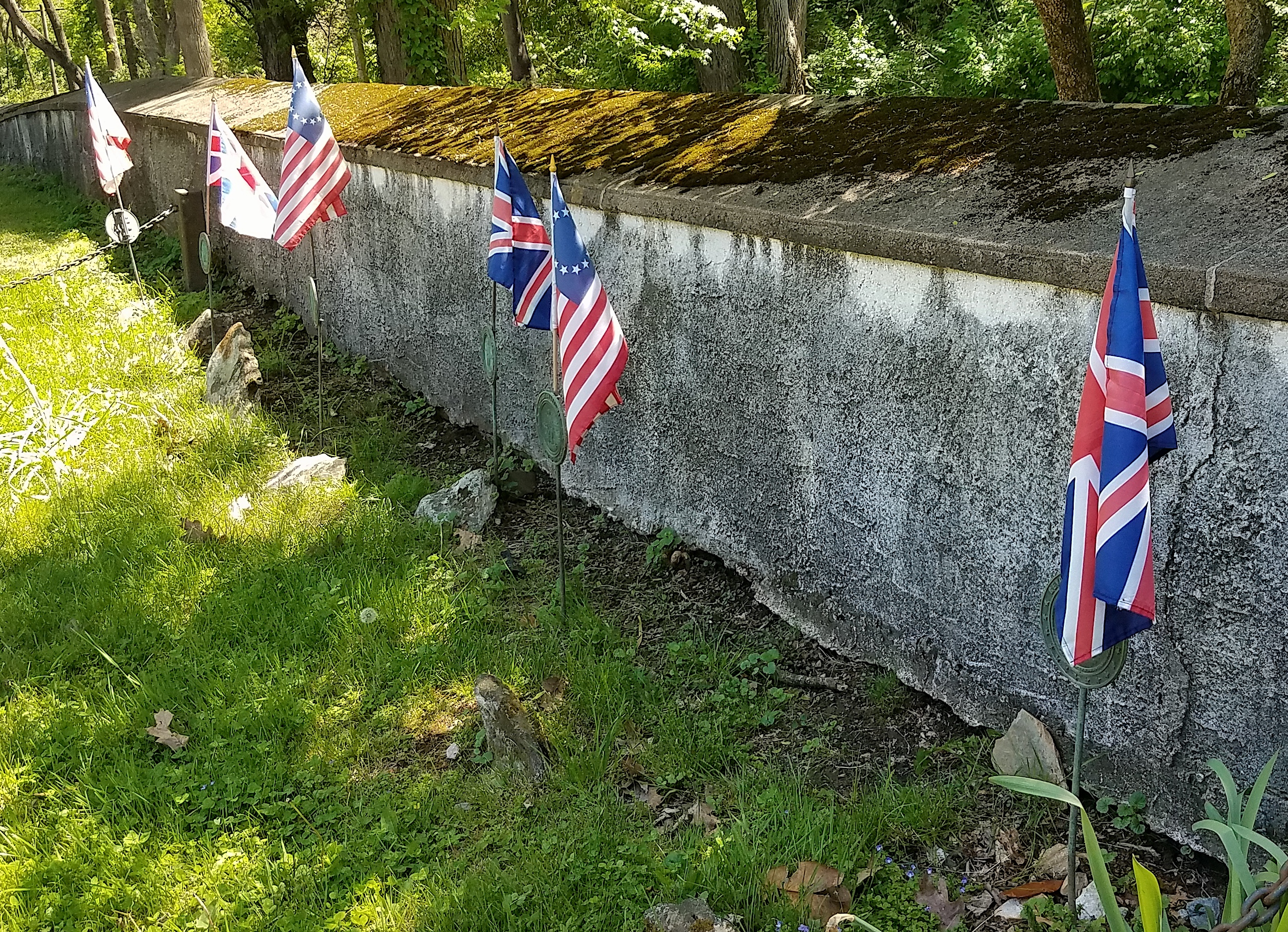
Shared war graves of British and American soldiers killed in the American Revolution, located in the churchyard of St. Peter's Church in the Great Valley, Chester County, Pennsylvania

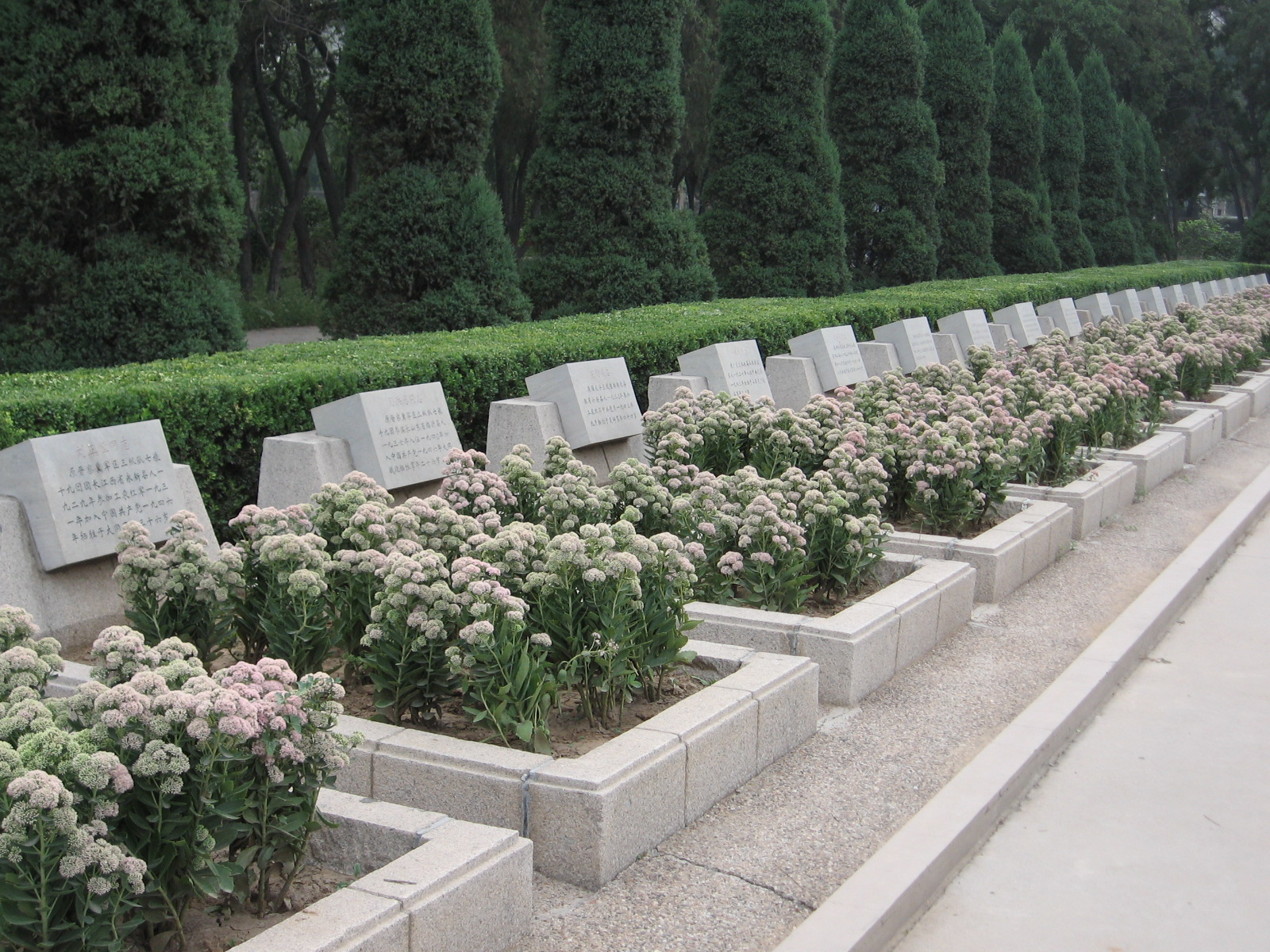
Graves of Chinese soldiers killed in the Second Sino-Japanese War and Chinese Communist Revolution, Shijiazhuang, China

== See also ==
- American Battle Monuments Commission
- Burial at sea
- Canadian war cemeteries
- Commonwealth War Graves Commission
- Missing in action
- Mortuary Affairs
- National cemetery
- Tomb of the Unknown Soldier
- United Nations Memorial Cemetery
- War memorial
