= Canadian war cemeteries =

Burial of Private Robert Whitehead (1896–1916), Canadian Infantry, Canadian Expeditionary Force, 95th Battalion, at Shorncliffe Military Cemetery

Canadian war cemeteries are sites for the burial of Canadian military personnel who died in conflicts since Canadian Confederation in 1867. Most of the graves are for the dead in the First and Second World Wars. But, some are for conflicts since 1945.

Most are found abroad—mainly in Europe—and a few are within Canada. The majority are public cemeteries and many are shared with other countries, some with the Commonwealth of Nations, usually administered by the Commonwealth War Graves Commission.

== Europe ==
=== Belgium ===
- Adegem Canadian War Cemetery
- Florenville Cemetery
- Saint Mary Cemetery

=== Cyprus ===
- Dhekelia Cemetery

=== Denmark ===
- Copenhagen Cemetery

=== England ===
- Brookwood Cemetery
- Cliveden
- Cheadle-Gatley
- Farnborough
- Gosport
- Hebburn
- Helston
- Langar
- North Luffenham
- Portland, Dorset – Royal Naval Cemetery
- Radcliffe-On-Trent
- Seaton
- St. Merryn
- Wallasey-Wirral

=== France ===
- Adanac Military Cemetery, Courcelette – First World War
- Ars-laquenexy
- Bayeux War Commonwealth War Graves Commission Cemetery, Bayeux – Second World War
- Bény-sur-Mer Canadian War Cemetery, Bény-sur-Mer – Second World War
- Bistroff
- Bretteville-sur-Laize Canadian War Cemetery, Bretteville-sur-Laize – Second World War
- Canada Cemetery, Tilloy-lez-Cambrai – First World War
- Canadian Cemetery No. 2, Pas-de-Calais – First World War
- Choloy
- Dieppe Canadian War Cemetery, Dieppe – Second World War
- Givenchy Road Canadian Cemetery, Pas-de-Calais – First World War
- Le Vigan
- Lelling
- Marville
- Metz
- Piennes
- St. Avold
- Y Ravine Commonwealth War Graves Commission Cemetery, Beaumont-Hamel – First World War

=== Germany ===
- Arnsberg
- Durnbach
- Dörlinbach
- Hannover
- Iserlohn
- Karlsruhe
- Kippenheim
- Kuppenheim
- Lahr
- Rheinburg British War Cemetery
- Rheindalen
- Rheinmünster-Söllingen
- Werl
- Willstatt
- Zweibrücken

=== Italy ===
- Agira – Second World War
- Cagliari
- Cerami, Provincia di Enna, Sicilia
- Moro River Ortona
- Villanova

=== Netherlands ===
- Bergen-op-Zoom Canadian War Cemetery
- Holten
- Nijmegen
- Groesbeek Canadian War Cemetery – Second World War

=== Northern Ireland ===
- Belfast City

=== Scotland ===
- Arbroath
- Glasgow
- Lossiemouth

== Asia ==
=== Hong Kong ===
- Sai Wan War Cemetery - Second World War
- Stanley Military Cemetery - Second World War

=== Japan ===
- Commonwealth War Cemetery - Yokohama, Japan

=== South Korea ===
- United Nations Memorial Cemetery

== North America ==
=== Canada ===
- Beechwood Cemetery - Ottawa, Ontario
- Notre Dame Cemetery - Ottawa, Ontario
- Brookside Cemetery - Winnipeg, Manitoba

== See also ==
- Commonwealth War Graves Commission
