= Bény-sur-Mer Canadian War Cemetery =

CWGC cemetery in Calvados, France

- Commonwealth War Graves Commission
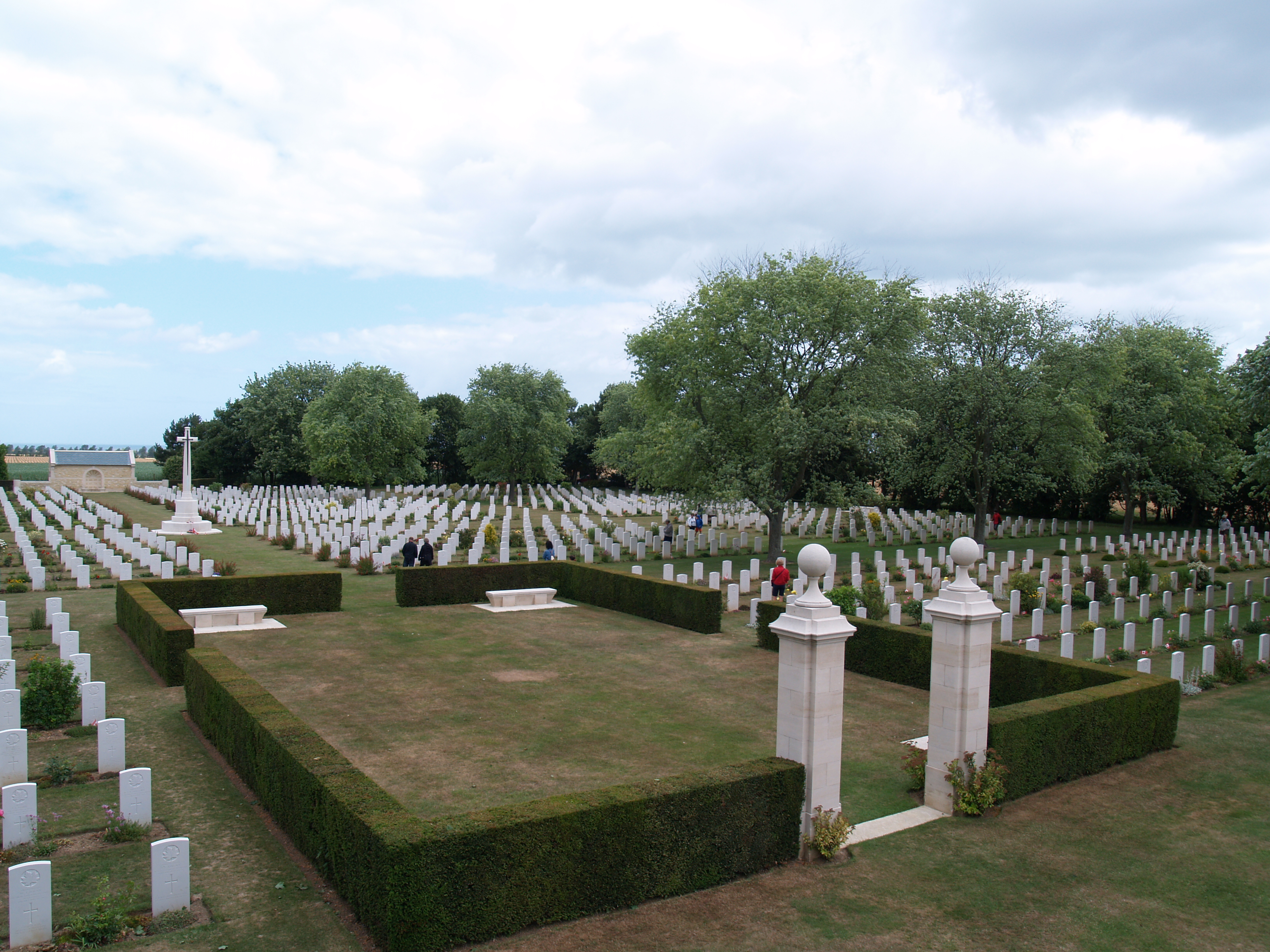
- The Cross of Sacrifice and war graves in Bény-sur-Mer Cemetery
- Used for those deceased 1944
- Established: 1944
- Location: 49°18′9″N 0°27′1″W near Reviers, Calvados, France
- Designed by: Philip Hepworth
- Total burials: 2,048
- Unknowns: 19

Burials by nation
- Canada: 2044 France: 1 United Kingdom: 3

Burials by war
- World War II

The Bény-sur-Mer Canadian War Cemetery (French: Cimetière militaire canadien de Bény-sur-Mer) is a burial ground containing predominantly Canadian soldiers killed during the early stages of the Battle of Normandy in the Second World War. It is located in, and named after, Bény-sur-Mer, in the Calvados department, near Caen, in lower Normandy. As is typical of war cemeteries in France, the grounds are landscaped and kept. Contained within the cemetery is a cross of sacrifice, a monument typical of memorials designed by the Commonwealth War Graves Commission.

Canadian soldiers killed later, in the Battle of Normandy, are buried south-east of Caen, in the Bretteville-sur-Laize Canadian War Cemetery, located in Cintheaux.

== History ==
Bény-sur-Mer was created as a permanent resting place for Canadian soldiers who had been temporarily interred in smaller plots close to where they fell. As is usual for war cemeteries or monuments, France granted Canada a perpetual concession to the land occupied by the cemetery.

The graves contain soldiers from the 3rd Canadian Division and 15 airmen killed during the Battle of Normandy, as well as three British graves and one French grave, for a total of 2,048 markers. The French grave belongs to a French resistance soldier named R. Guenard, who fought and died alongside the Canadians and who had no known relatives. His marker is inscribed "Mort pour la France – 19-7-1944".

Because of confusion during the movement of remains from temporary cemeteries, the remains of one Canadian soldier were misplaced; his tombstone is set apart from the others and bears an inscription stating that it is known that his remains are in the Bény-sur-Mer cemetery. Bény-sur-Mer contains the remains of nine sets of brothers.

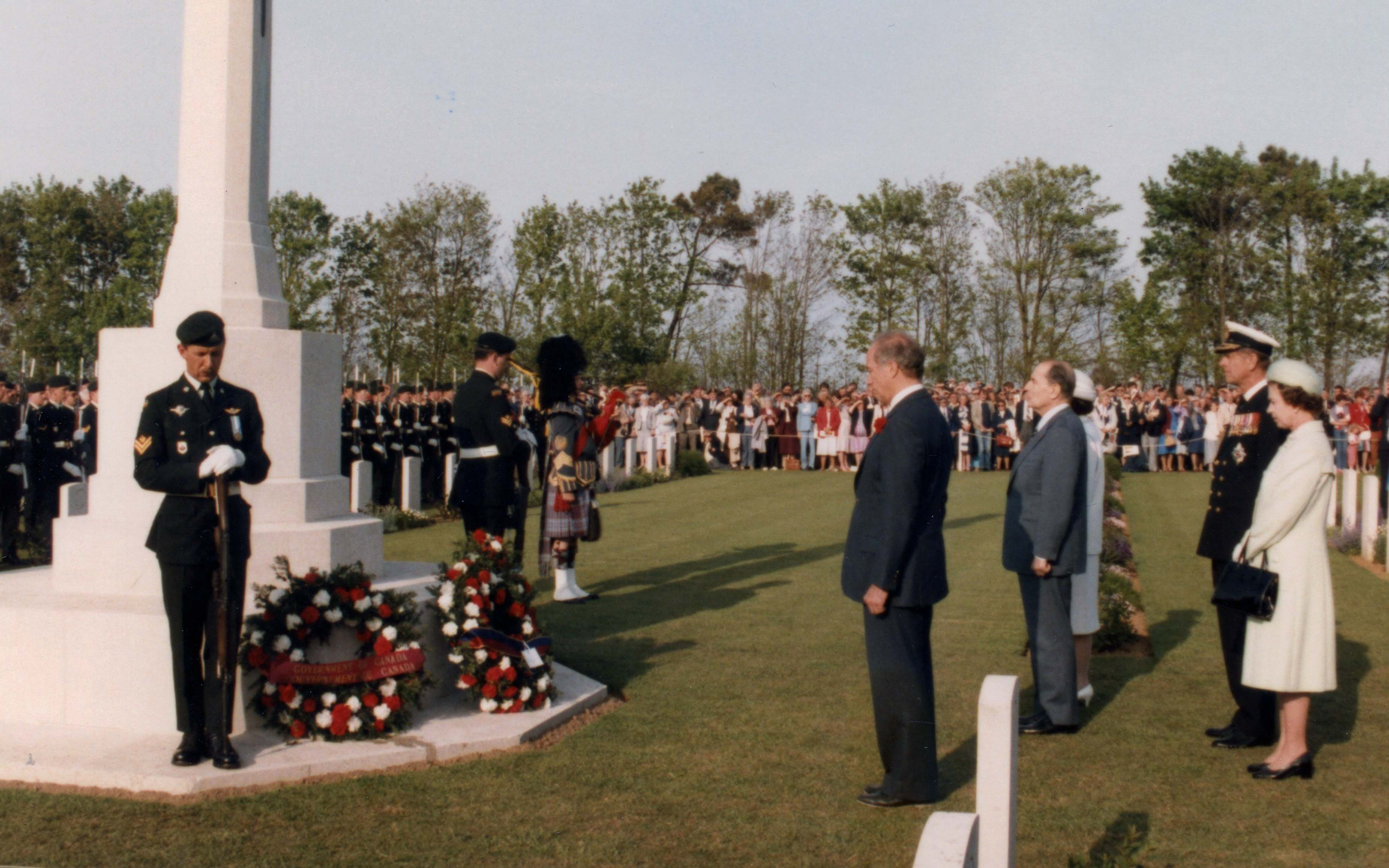
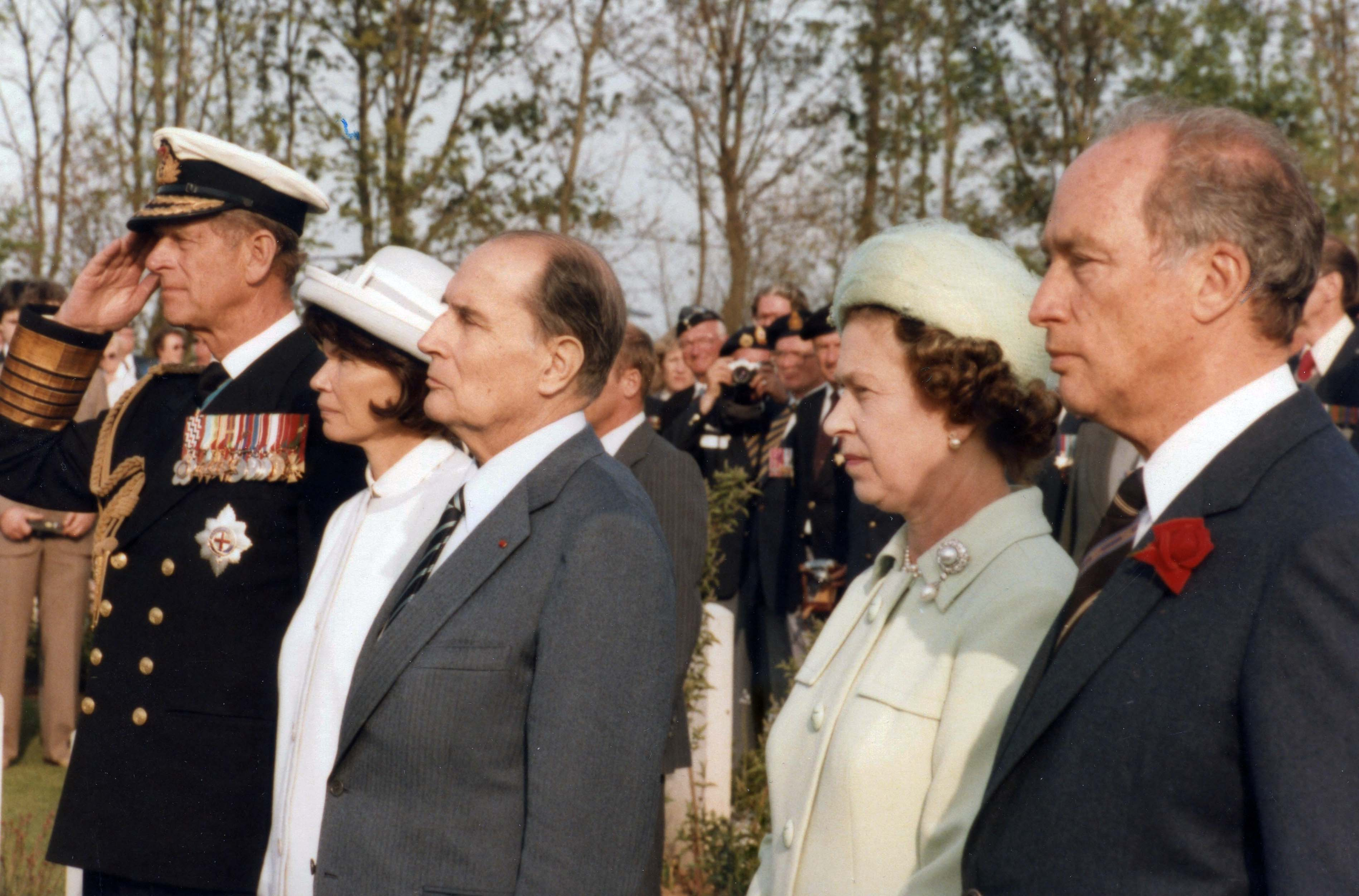
Elizabeth II, Queen of Canada, with her prime minister, Pierre Trudeau, and husband, the Duke of Edinburgh, as well as President of France François Mitterrand and his wife, Danielle Mitterrand, at a ceremony at the Bény-sur-Mer Canadian War Cemetery, on the 40th anniversary of the Normandy landings, 6 June 1984

A large number of dead in the cemetery were killed in early July 1944, in the Battle for Caen. The cemetery also contains soldiers who fell during the initial D-Day assault of Juno Beach. Some of the Canadian prisoners of war illegally executed at Ardenne Abbey are interred here. It also contains the grave of the Reverend (Honorary Captain) Walter Leslie Brown, chaplain to the 27th Armoured Regiment (Sherbrooke Fusiliers) and the only chaplain killed in cold blood during the Second World War. Brown was murdered on the night of June 6 to 7, by members of III/25th S.S. Panzer Grenedier Regiment, Galmanche; but, his body was not found until July, 1944. Canadians killed later in the campaign were interred in the Bretteville-sur-Laize Canadian War Cemetery.

The site was featured in the seventh leg of The Amazing Race Canada's second season, wherein contestants arrived at the cemetery and paid their respects before retrieving their clue along with a "LEST WE FORGET" card.

== Location ==
The cemetery is about one kilometre east of the village of Reviers, in the Calvados department, on the Creully-Tailleville-Ouistreham road. It is located 15 kilometres northwest of Caen, 18 kilometres east of Bayeux, and three and a half kilometres south of Courseulles-sur-Mer. The village of Bény-sur-Mer is some two kilometres south-east of the cemetery. The cemetery can be accessed any time.

== Additional images ==
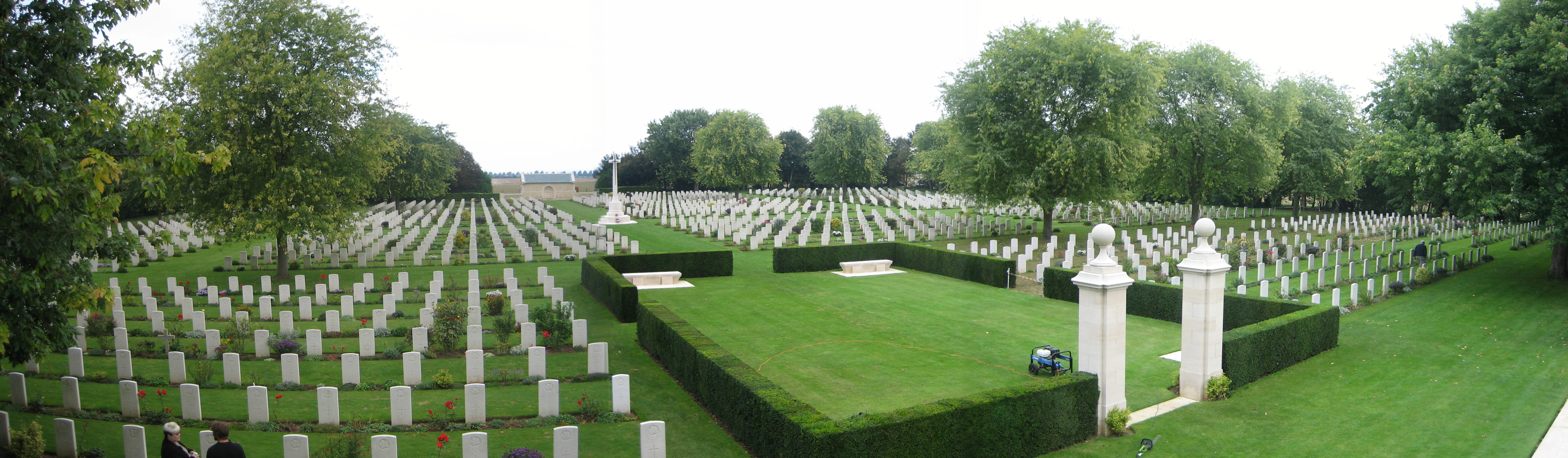
Bény-sur-Mer Canadian War Cemetery, September 2006. The Cross of Sacrifice is visible in the centre.
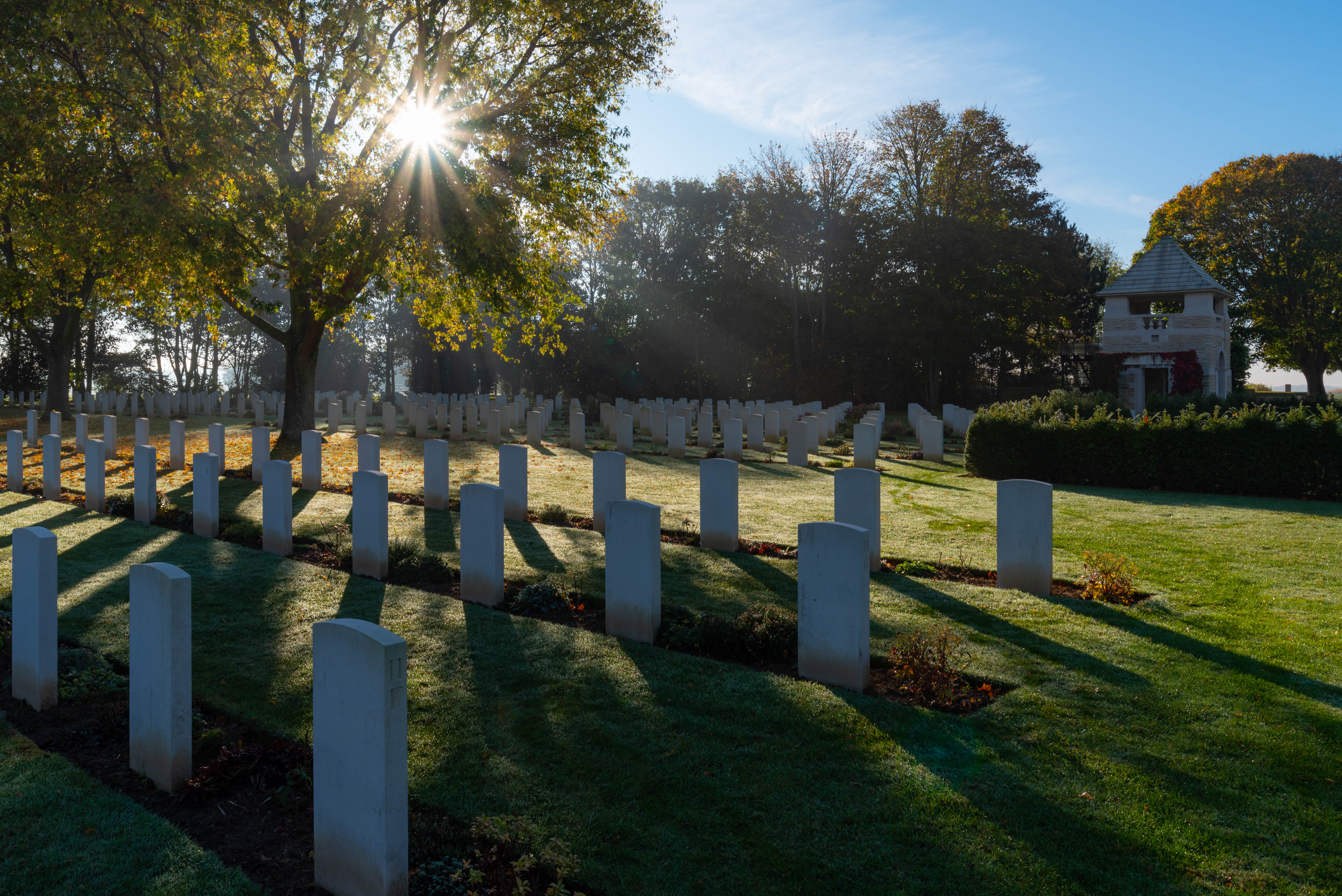
Graves aligned.

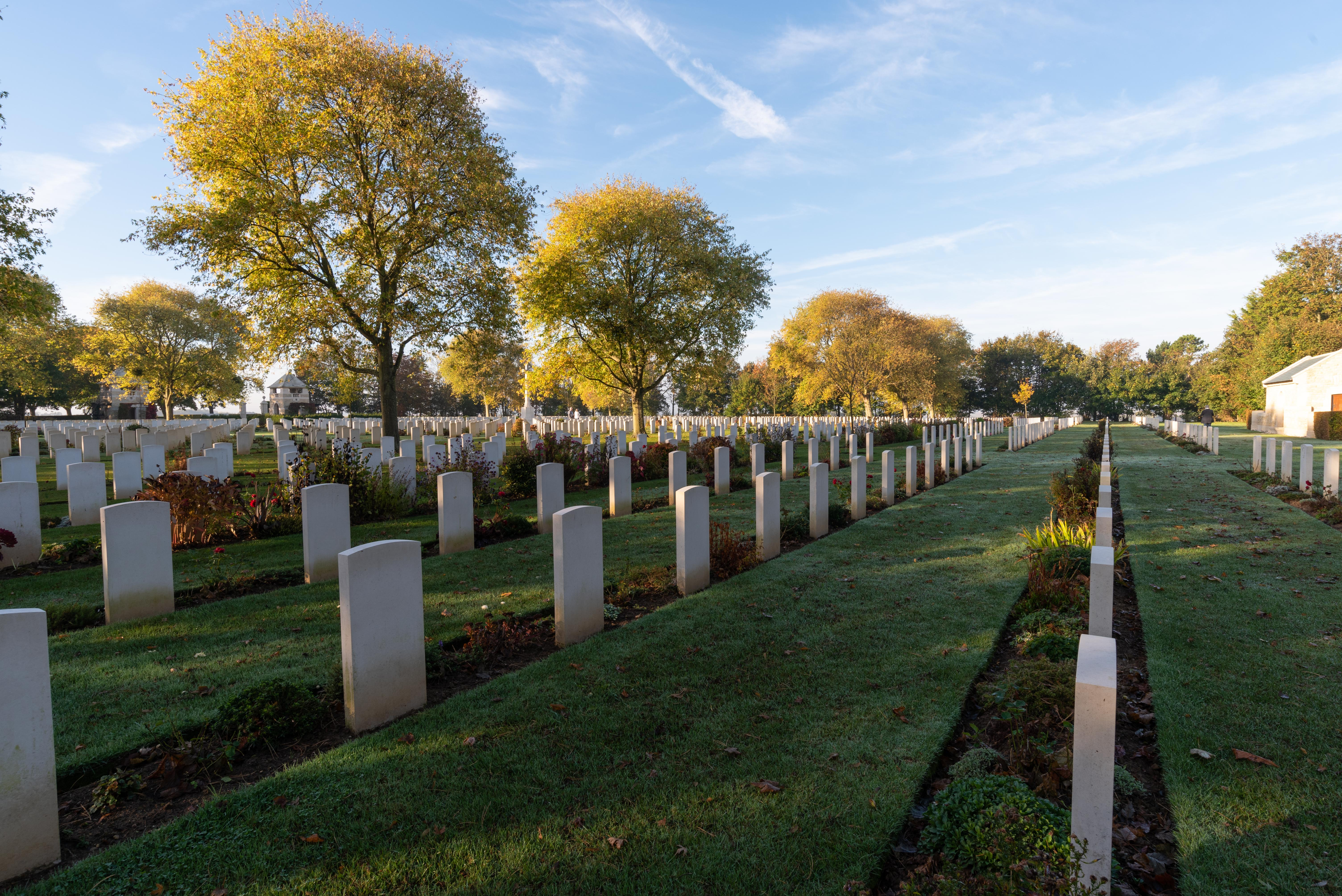
Graves aligned.

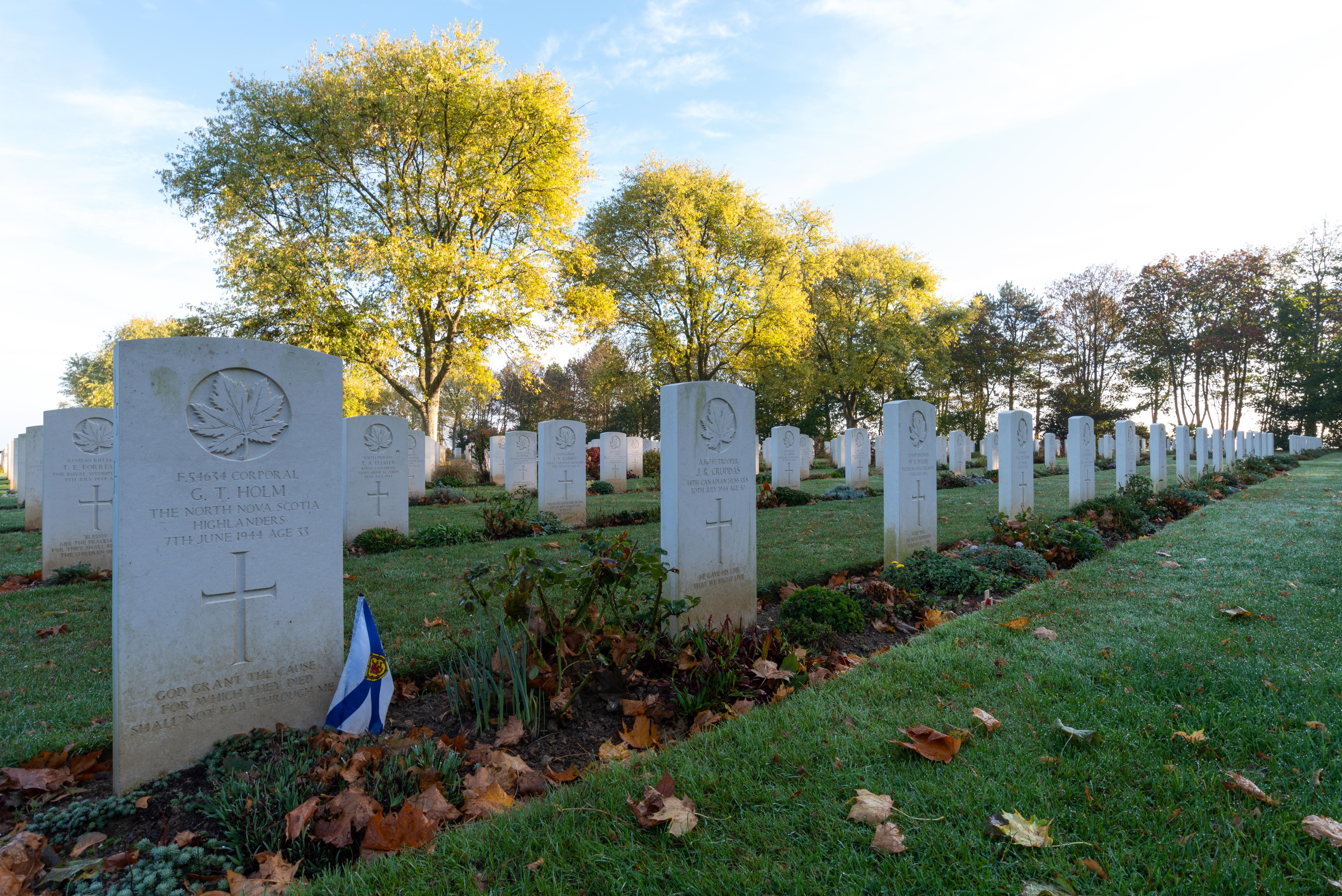
Graves aligned.

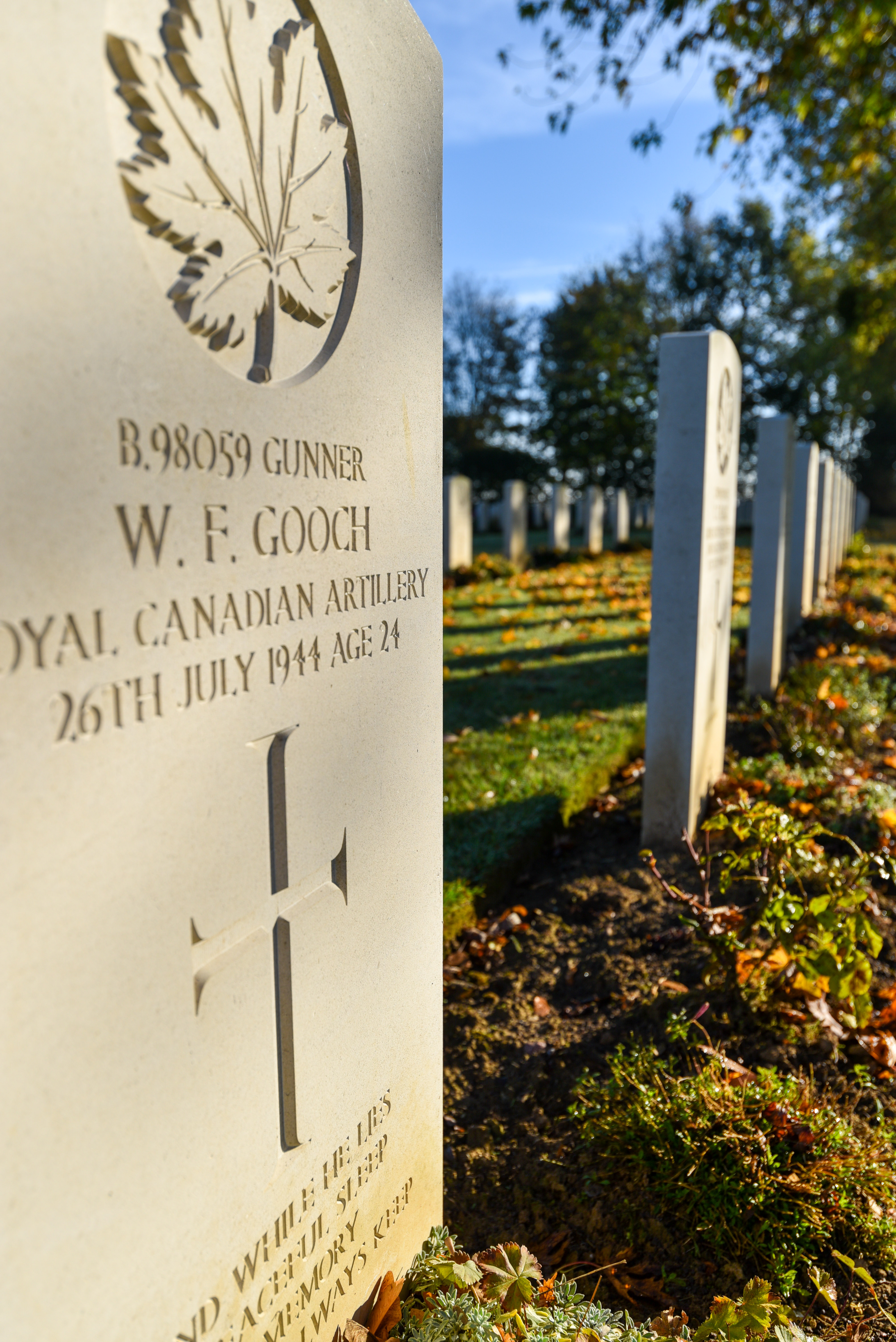
Detail on a grave.

Grave of Mr. R. Guenard, 2006

== See also ==
- List of military cemeteries in Normandy
- Canadian war cemeteries
