= Neuville-St Vaast German war cemetery =

German WWI cemetery

Neuville-St Vaast German War Cemetery
- German War Graves Commission (Volksbund Deutsche Kriegsgräberfürsorge)
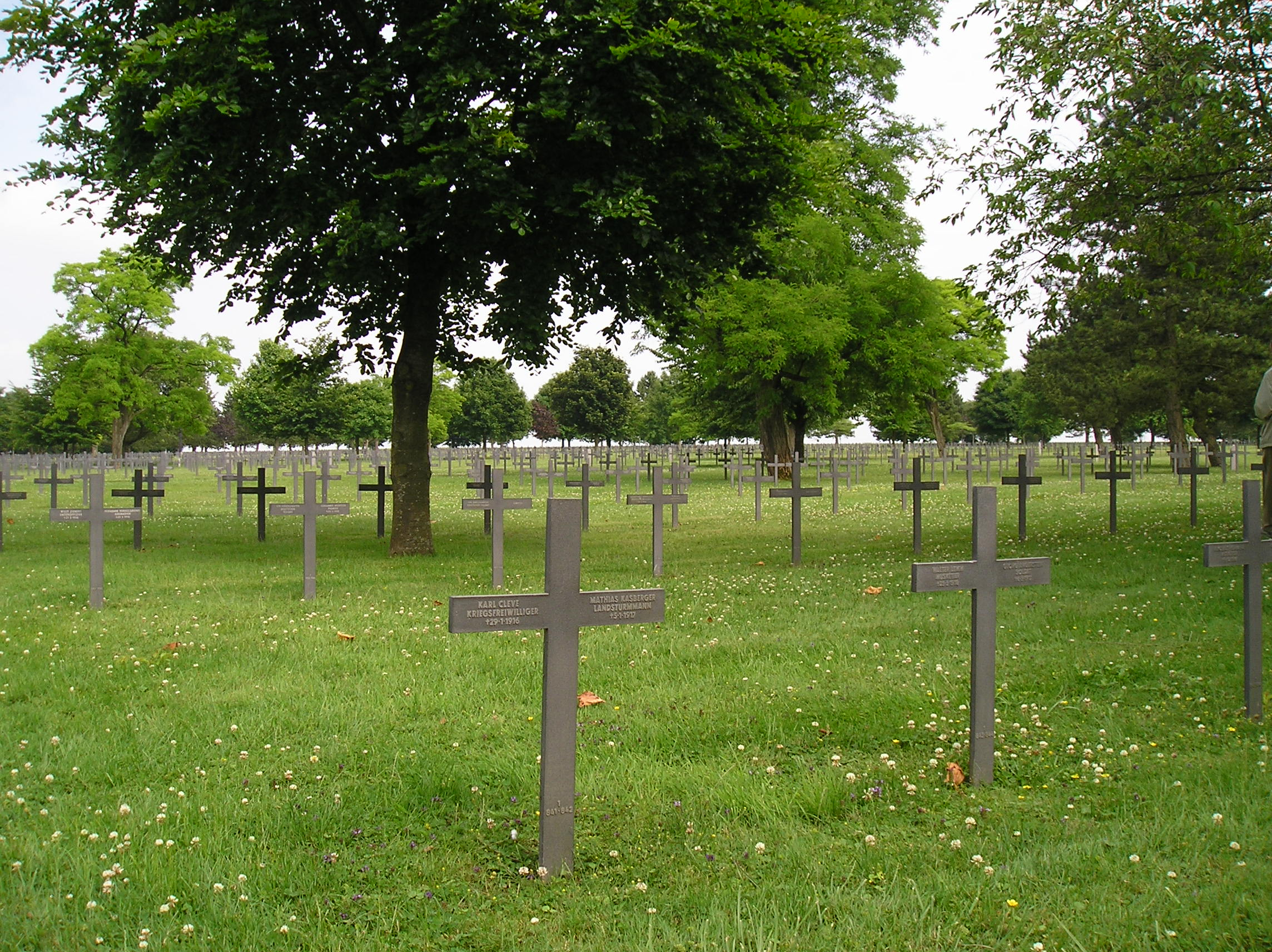
- The sea of crosses at Neuville-St. Vaast
- Used for those deceased 1914-1918
- Established: 1919
- Location: 50°20′32″N 2°45′15″E near Neuville-Saint-Vaast, near Arras, France
- Total burials: 44,833

Burials by nation
- German Empire

Burials by war
- World War I

UNESCO World Heritage Site
- Official name: Funerary and memory sites of the First World War (Western Front)
- Type: Cultural
- Criteria: i, ii, vi
- Designated: 2023 (45th session)
- Reference no.: 1567-PC08

The Neuville-St Vaast German War Cemetery (also called Maison Blanche) is a World War I cemetery located near Neuville-Saint-Vaast, a small village, near Arras, Pas-de-Calais, in Northern France. It is the largest German cemetery in France, containing 44,833 burials, of which 8,040 were never identified.

== Establishment ==
The cemetery was established by the French Government in 1919 as a collective facility for German Empire war dead whose battlefield graves and graveyards lay scattered directly to the north, east and south of the Arras region. It is now administered by the German War Graves Commission - Volksbund Deutsche Kriegsgräberfürsorge (V.D.K.).

== Construction & Administration ==
Unlike the war cemeteries for Allied casualties, which generally lie with an open aspect, highly visible in the landscape about them, with imposing edifice memorials to mark their sites, the German cemetery near Neuville-St. Vaast is discreetly designed and more understated. Located amidst the farming fields of the rolling Artois landscape, it is screened from the outside by an earth embankment planted with tall hedges, which mostly obscures it from its surroundings. There is no central building, but a small chapel at the gateway which holds directories that list alphabetically the names of the soldiers' bodies that are interred within the cemetery, identifying the plot and section for each grave and providing a map showing their location.

Between 1975 and 1983 the VDK completely reorganized the cemetery, replacing deteriorating wooden crosses that previously marked the graves with new ones made of metal with engraved specifics: Name, Rank and Date of Death. Each cross lists four individual names, since it is the location marker for four graves in the plot it stands over.

Within the cemetery there are 129 stone grave markers, of a different design from the uniform metal grey cross, displaying the Star of David for the graves of Jewish-German soldiers who fell in action fighting for Imperial Germany.

A World War I battlefield stone war memorial, fashioned originally by the men of Hanoverian Infantry Regiment Nr.164, was relocated into the cemetery's grounds post-war.

Several small dug-out fortifications still exist within the cemetery's perimeter, relics from the fighting that raged across the area in World War I.

== Other war cemeteries around Neuville-Saint-Vaast ==
In the region of Nord-Pas-de-Calais there are more than 700 war cemeteries of all participating nations in the world war. Around Neuville-Saint-Vaast these are:

- Notre-Dame-de-Lorette
- Nécropole nationale de la Targette
- La Targette British Cemetery - Neuville-Saint-Vaast
- Cabaret-Rouge British Cemetery - Souchez
- Cimetière tchécoslavaque/polonais - Neuville Saint Vaast
- Two Canadian cemeteries at the nearby Canadian National Vimy Memorial as well as numerous others in the surrounding countryside.
