= Adegem =

- Village
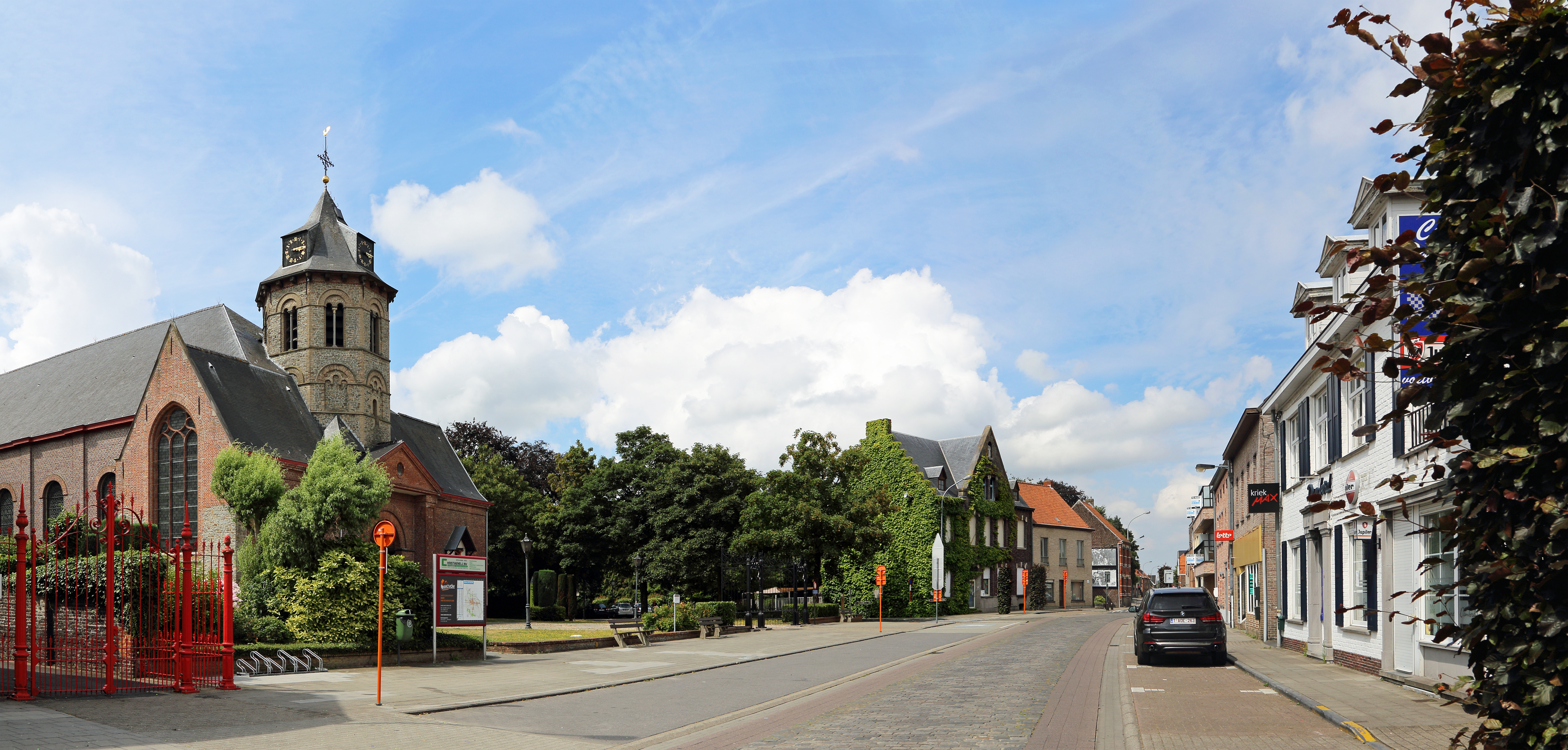
- Village view

- Location in Belgium
- Coordinates: 51.2003°N 3.4886°E
- Country: Belgium
- Province: East Flanders
- Municipality: Maldegem

Area
  - Total: 26.14 km^{2} (10.09 sq mi)

Population (2021)
  - Total: 6,563
  - Density: 251.1/km^{2} (650.3/sq mi)
- Time zone: CET
- Website: adegem.be

Adegem is a village and deelgemeente (sub-municipality) in the municipality of Maldegem in the Belgian province of East Flanders. The village is located about 19 kilometres (12 mi) east of Bruges.

== History ==
The area around Adegem was mapped between 1993 and 1995, and multiple structures were discovered from the Bronze Age. The village was first mentioned in 840 as Addingahim, and means "settlement of the people of Ado (person)". In 1127, Robert de Jonge, the owner of Castle Raverschoot near Adegem, was implicated in the murder of Charles the Good, Count of Flanders, and his castle was destroyed. For most of its history, Adegem was a cultivation settlement belonging to the amt Maldegem.

During the 19th century, Adegem started to develop into a village. In 1800, it became an independent municipality. In 1859, the Schipdonk canal was dug and the village started to industrialise. In 1862, a railway station opened.

In 1939, Flugplatz Maldegem was built near Adegem which was used by the Germans during World War II and bombed multiple times by the Allies. On 12 September 1944, Adegem was liberated by Canadian troops who managed to surprise the Germans, and took the village and airport without a fight. In 1945, the Adegem Canadian War Cemetery was established which contains the graves of 1,112 identified and 48 unknown soldiers. It also contains British, Free Polish and other Commonwealth graves.

Adegem was an independent municipality until 1977 when it was merged into Maldegem. In 1994, a Canadian Polish War museum opened in Adegem.

== Notable people ==
- Noël Foré (1932–1994), professional road bicycle racer
- Emiel Verstrynge (born 2002), cyclist

== Gallery ==
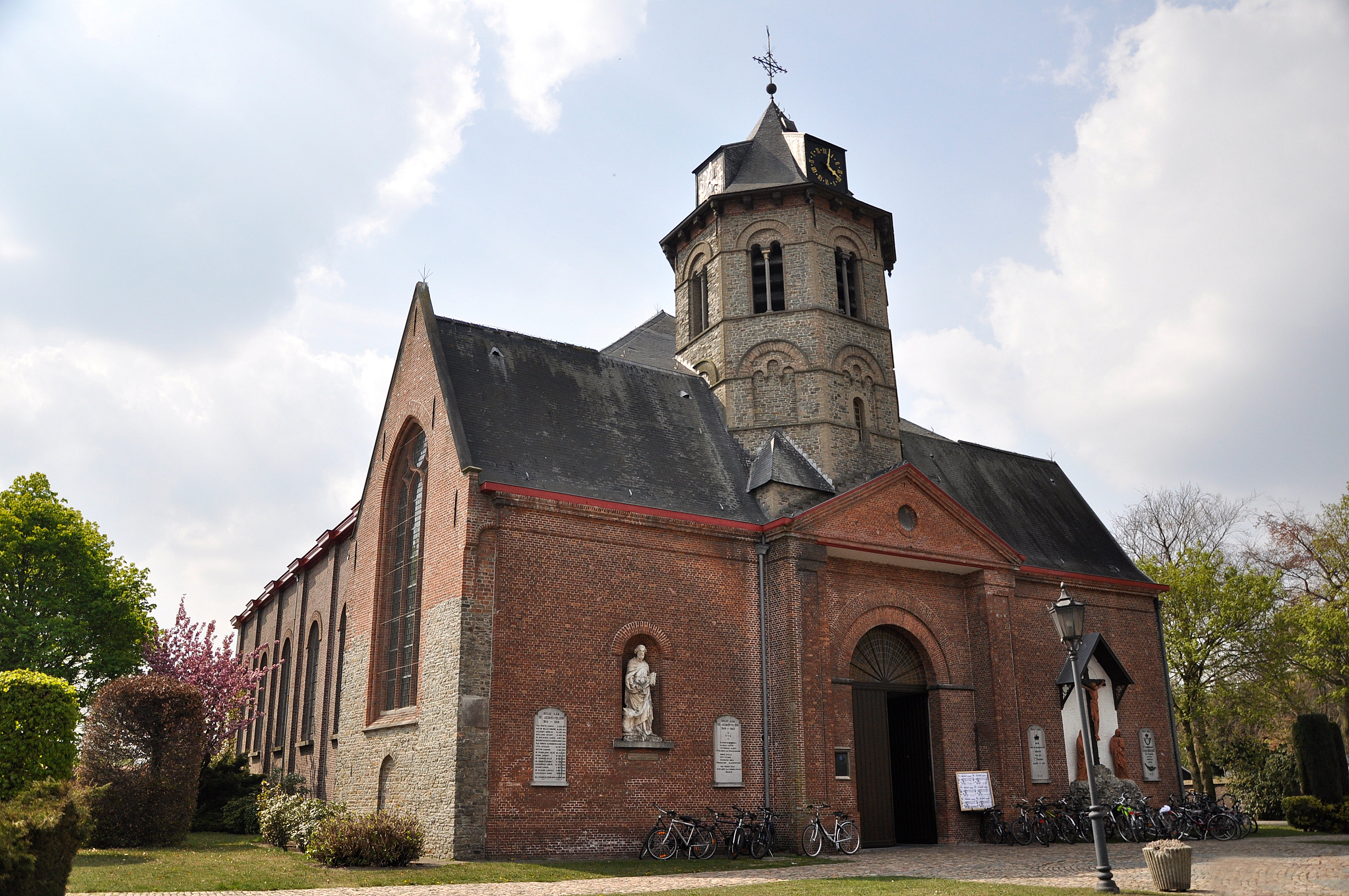
St Adrianus Church

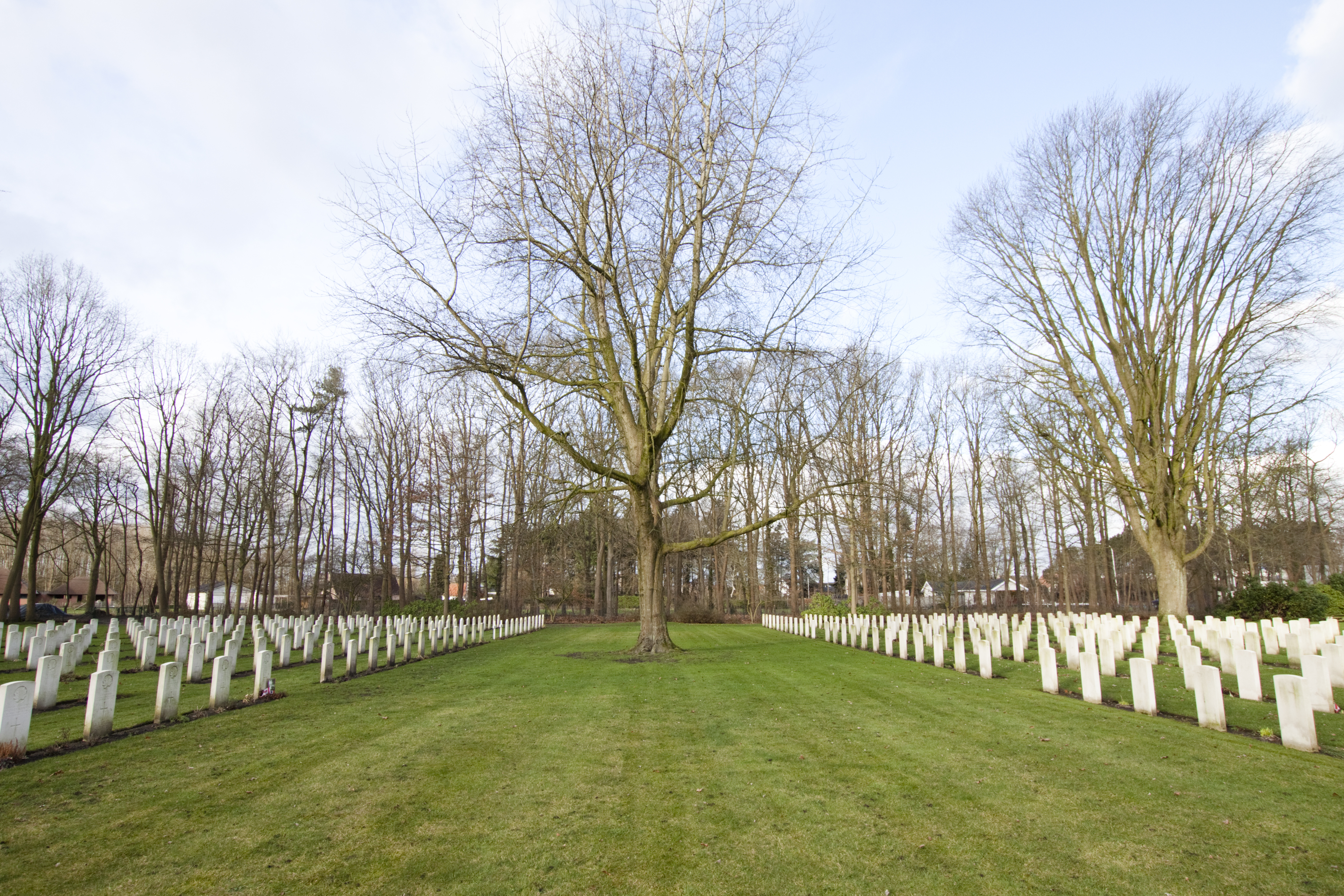
Canadian War Cemetery

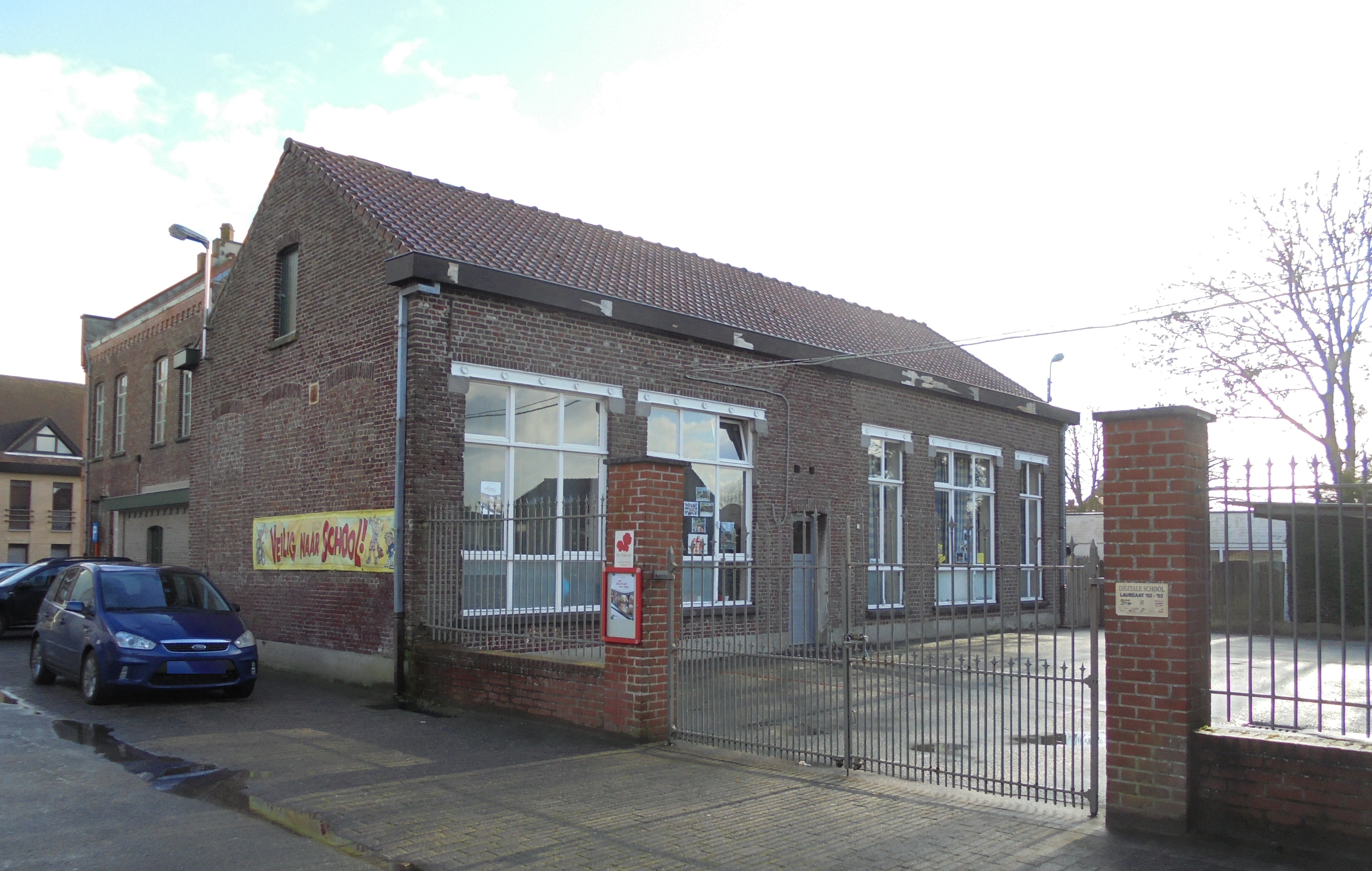
School

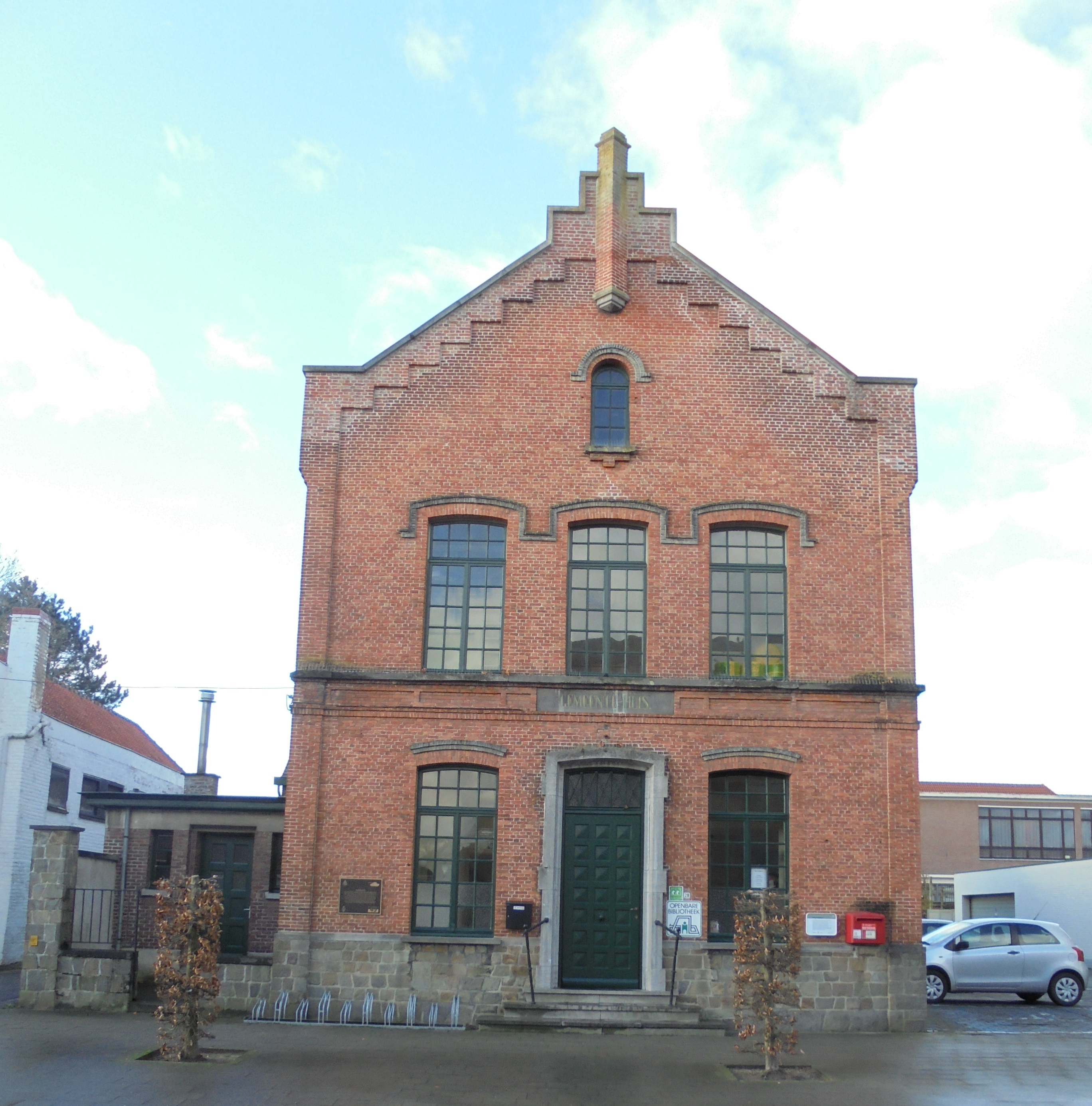
Former town hall
