= Neuville-Saint-Vaast =

- Commune
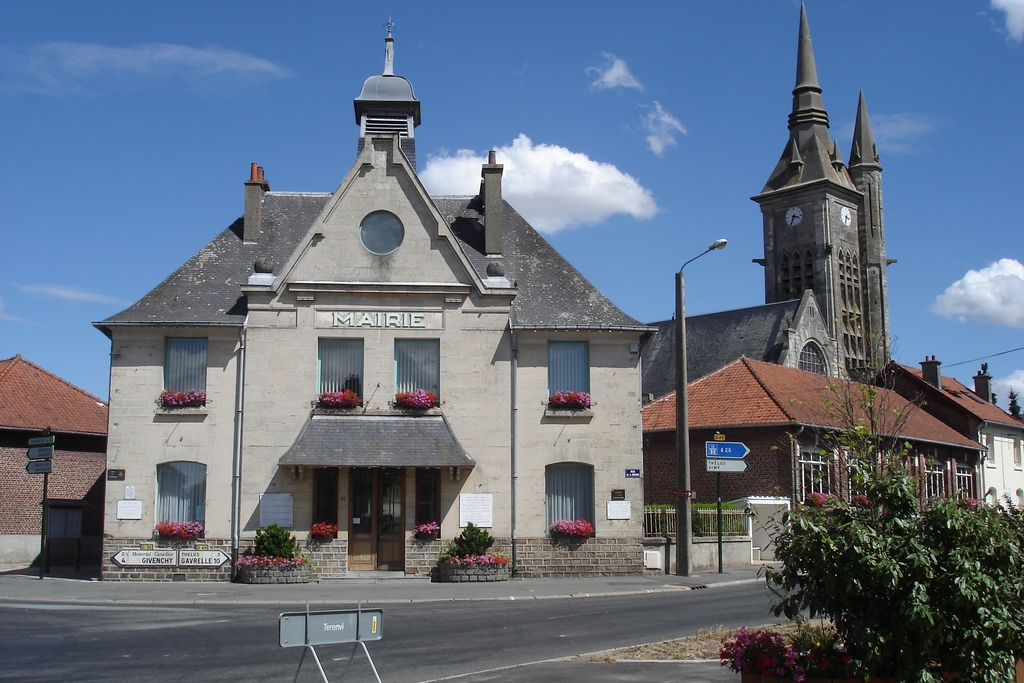
- Town hall and the church

- Coat of arms
- Location of Neuville-Saint-Vaast
- Location within France Location within Hauts-de-France
- Coordinates: 50°21′22″N 2°45′32″E
- Country: France
- Region: Hauts-de-France
- Department: Pas-de-Calais
- Arrondissement: Arras
- Canton: Arras-1
- Intercommunality: CU Arras

Government
  - Mayor (2020–2026): Jean-Pierre Puchois
- Area^{1}: 12.59 km^{2} (4.86 sq mi)
- Elevation: 107 m (351 ft)
- Highest elevation: 144 m (472 ft)
- Lowest elevation: 81 m (266 ft)
- Population (2023): 1,628
  - Density: 129.3/km^{2} (334.9/sq mi)
- Time zone: UTC+01:00 (CET)
  - Summer (DST): UTC+02:00 (CEST)
- INSEE/Postal code: 62609 /62580
- ^{1} French Land Register data, which excludes lakes, ponds, glaciers > 1 km^{2} (0.386 sq mi or 247 acres) and river estuaries.

Neuville-Saint-Vaast (French pronunciation: [nøvil sɛ̃ va]) is a commune in the Pas-de-Calais department in the Hauts-de-France region of France 3.2 kilometres (2.0 mi) south of the Canadian National Vimy Memorial dedicated to the Battle of Vimy Ridge. The Memorial was built on Hill 145, the highest point of the ridge to commemorate the battle and the Canadian soldiers who lost their lives during the First World War. The Memorial is also the site of the Canadian Cemetery No. 2, Neuville-St.-Vaast and Givenchy Road Canadian Cemetery, Neuville-St.-Vaast.

The Neuville-St Vaast German war cemetery (also called Maison Blanche) is the largest in France from WWI, with 44,833 buried here.

== Geography ==
Neuville-Saint-Vaast is 4 miles (6 km) north of Arras. Vimy Ridge rises from Neuville-St.-Vaast to its high point at Hill 145 (the location of the Canadian Memorial), where there is a steep drop off.

== History ==
In World War I, Neuville-Saint-Vaast was the location of intense mining activity by the tunnelling companies of the Royal Engineers. In March 1916, the New Zealand Tunnelling Company relieved the French 7/1 compagnie d'ingénieurs territoriaux in the "Labyrinth" sector of the Western Front. The German "Labyrinth" stronghold was located near Neuville-Saint-Vaast, between Roclincourt and Écurie and not far from Notre Dame de Lorette. On 29 March 1916, the New Zealand Tunnelling Company exchanged position with the 185th Tunnelling Company and moved to Roclincourt-Chantecler, a kilometre south of their old sector. The 176th Tunnelling Company moved to Neuville-Saint-Vaast in April 1916 and remained there for a considerable time, as did the 172nd Tunnelling Company, which was relieved at Neuville-Saint-Vaast by the 2nd Australian Tunnelling Company in May 1916.

== Population ==
Historical population
Year	Pop.	±% p.a.
1968	927	—
1975	973	+0.69%
1982	1,129	+2.15%
1990	1,295	+1.73%
1999	1,400	+0.87%
2007	1,477	+0.67%
2012	1,510	+0.44%
2017	1,526	+0.21%
2023	1,628	+1.08%
Source: INSEE

== Places of interest ==
- Canadian National Vimy Memorial
- Neuville-St Vaast German war cemetery

== Notable people ==
- Henri Gaudier-Brzeska, sculptor, died in the fighting here on the 5 June 1915.
- François Hennebique, an inventor of reinforced concrete, was born here on the 26 April 1842.

== See also ==
- Communes of the Pas-de-Calais department
- Givenchy Road Canadian Cemetery
- Canadian Cemetery No. 2
- Neuville-St Vaast German war cemetery
- Battle of Vimy Ridge
