= Givenchy Road Canadian Cemetery =

Burial ground in Pas-de-Calais, France

- Commonwealth War Graves Commission
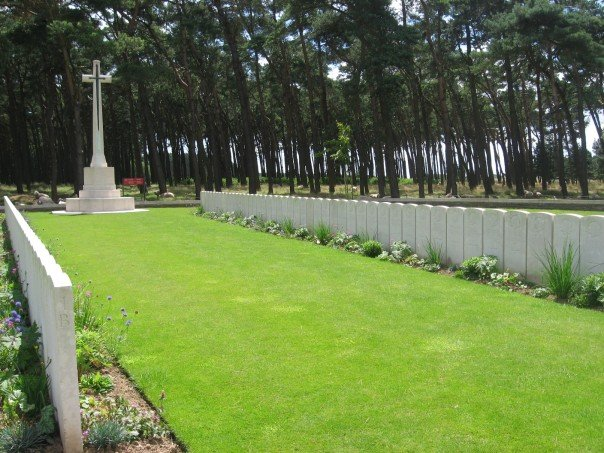
- Used for those deceased April 1917
- Established: April 1917
- Location: 50°22′33″N 2°45′53″E near Neuville-Saint-Vaast, Pas-de-Calais, France
- Total burials: 111
- Unknowns: 2

Burials by nation
- Canada 109

Burials by war
- World War I: 111

UNESCO World Heritage Site
- Official name: Funerary and memory sites of the First World War (Western Front)
- Type: Cultural
- Criteria: i, ii, vi
- Designated: 2023 (45th session)
- Reference no.: 1567-PC05

Givenchy Road Canadian Cemetery is a Commonwealth War Graves Commission burial ground for the dead of World War I situated on the grounds of the Canadian National Vimy Memorial Park near the French town of Neuville-Saint-Vaast.

This small cemetery contains the graves of 109 Canadian soldiers, principally of the Canadian 4th Division (rest with Princess Patricia's Canadian Light Infantry), all of whom fell between April 9, 1917 and April 13, 1917 during the Battle of Vimy Ridge.

== Foundation ==
The cemetery was originally established as a battlefield cemetery by the Canadian Corps and named CD 1. The cemetery covers an area of 849 square meters and was enclosed by a rubble wall. Although only being 250 meters from the nearby Canadian Cemetery No. 2, it was not incorporated into the cemetery like many other battlefield cemeteries created at the time.
