= Bretteville-sur-Laize Canadian War Cemetery =

Military cemetery in France

- Commonwealth War Graves Commission
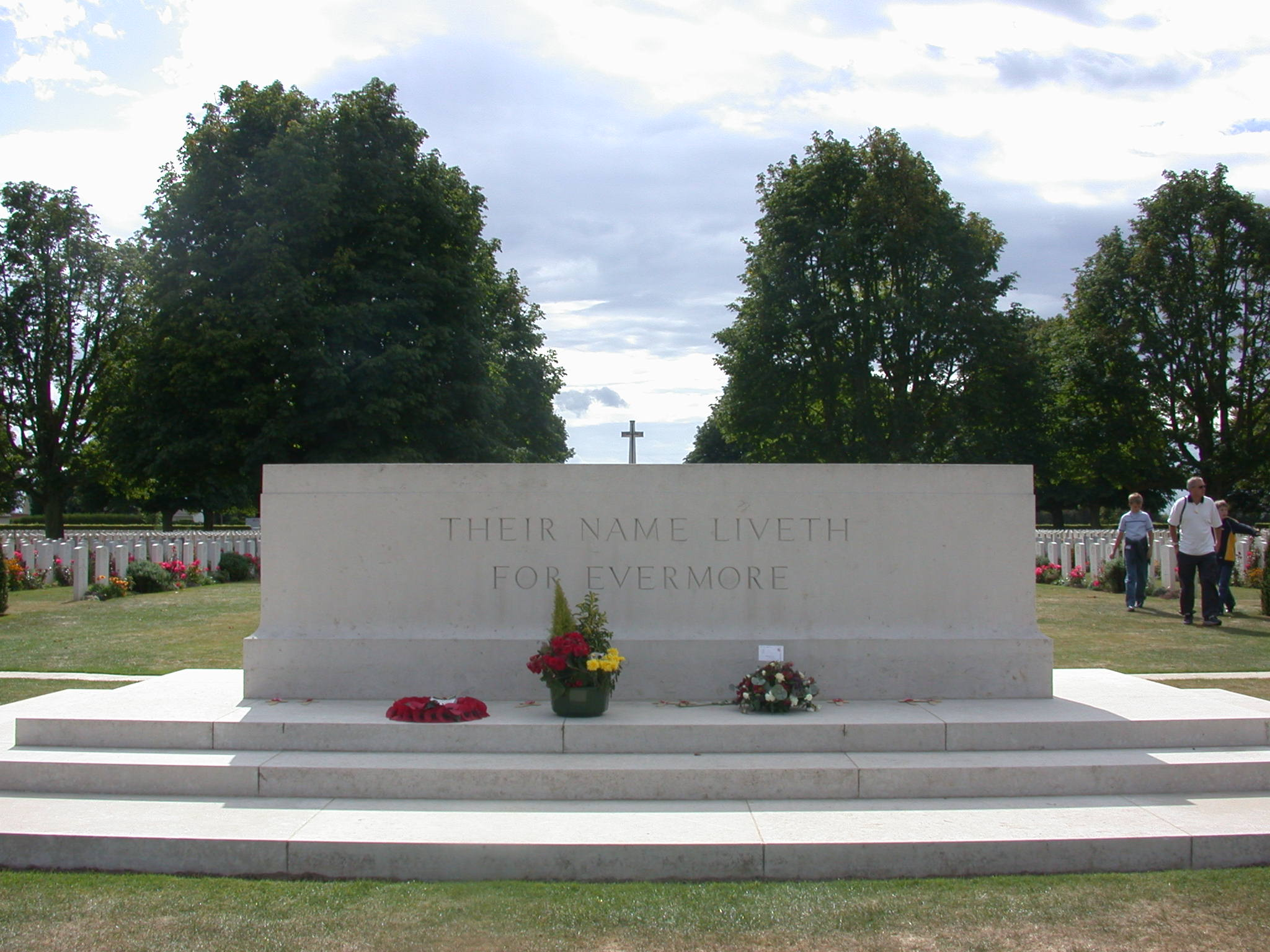
- The war stone in the centre of Bretteville-sur-Laize Canadian War Cemetery. The Cross of Sacrifice is visible in the background.
- Used for those deceased 1944; 81 years ago
- Established: 1944; 81 years ago
- Location: 49°3′37″N 0°17′34″W near Cintheaux, Calvados, France
- Total burials: 2,958
- Unknowns: 87

Burials by nation
- Canada: 2,782 Britain: 80; Australia: 1 France: 1 New Zealand: 1

Burials by war
- World War II

The Bretteville-sur-Laize Canadian War Cemetery is a war cemetery containing predominantly Canadian soldiers killed during the later stages of the Battle of Normandy, France, in the Second World War. It is located close to the village of Cintheaux and named after Bretteville-sur-Laize in the Calvados department, between Caen and Falaise in lower Normandy.

== History ==
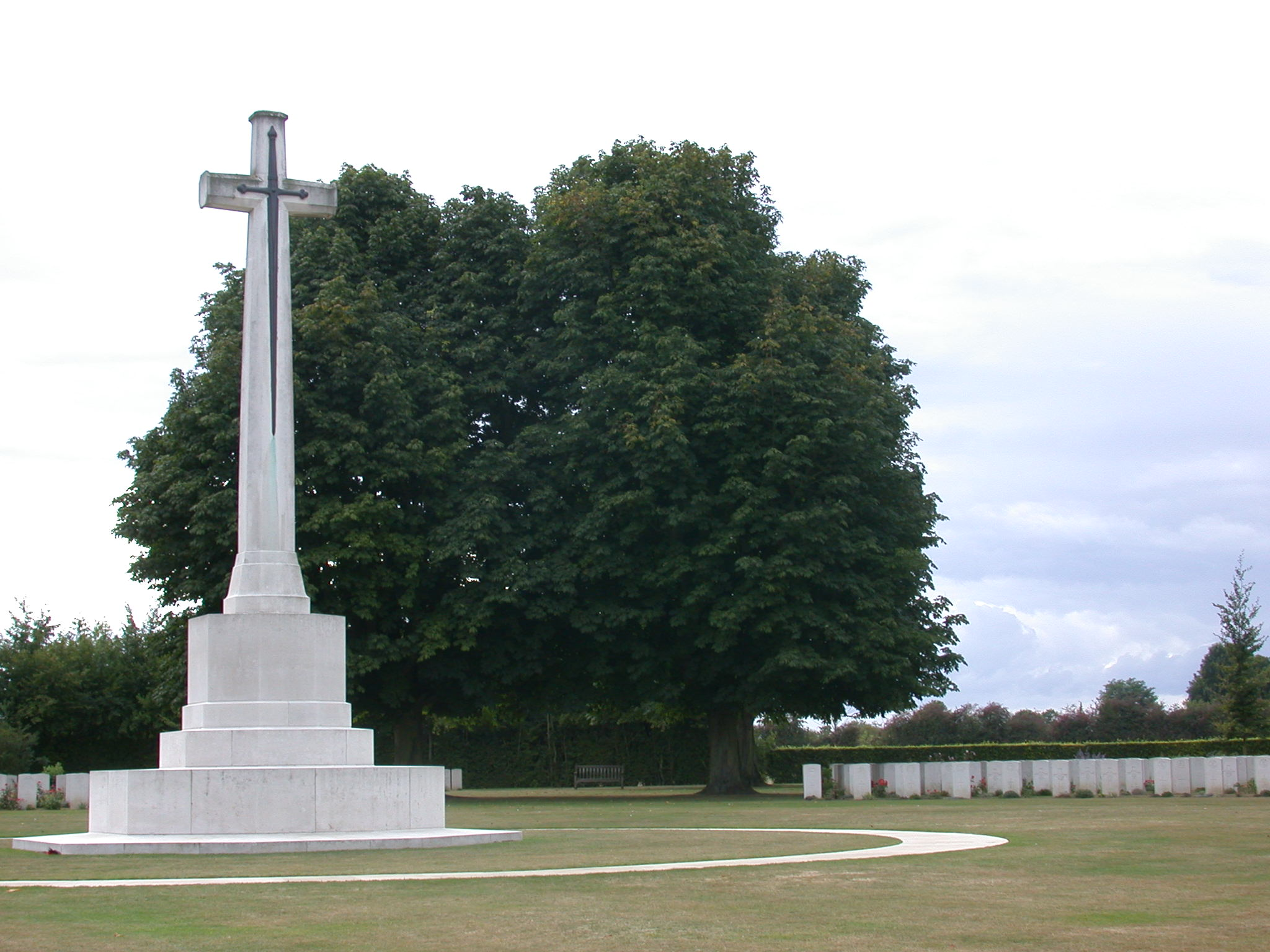
The Cross of Sacrifice of Bretteville-sur-Laize Canadian War Cemetery.

Bretteville-sur-Laize was created as a permanent resting place for Canadian soldiers who had been temporarily buried in smaller plots close to where they fell. At the time of the cemetery's creation, France granted Canada a perpetual concession to the land occupied by the cemetery. Of the 2,958 burials, 2,782 are Canadian of whom 87 remain unidentified, together with 80 British, four Australian and one each from France and New Zealand. There are records for 2,792 of the Canadian men.

A large number of dead in the cemetery were killed late July 1944 around Saint-André-sur-Orne and in the battle for the Falaise Pocket in August 1944. Soldiers from nearly every unit within the II Canadian Corps are represented in the cemetery.

Canadians killed earlier (June and early July) in the Battle of Normandy are buried near Juno Beach in the Bény-sur-Mer Canadian War Cemetery.

== Location ==
The cemetery is located on the N158 road between Caen and Falaise, about 14 km from Caen, in the commune of Cintheaux. However, there is no access directly from the roadway. The road into the cemetery, the Rue du Prieuré/D167 runs north out of the village of Cintheaux

It can be seen on Google Maps here

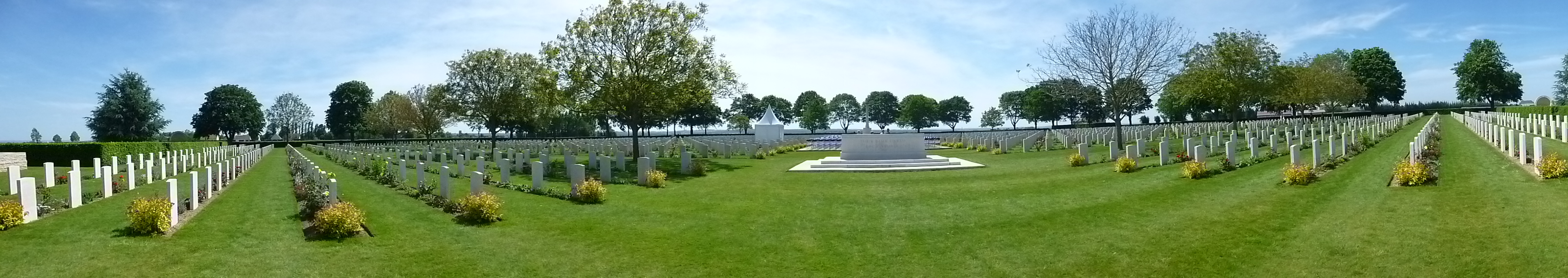
Panoramic view of Bretteville-sur-Laize Canadian War Cemetery.

== See also ==
- List of military cemeteries in Normandy
