= Cintheaux =

- Commune
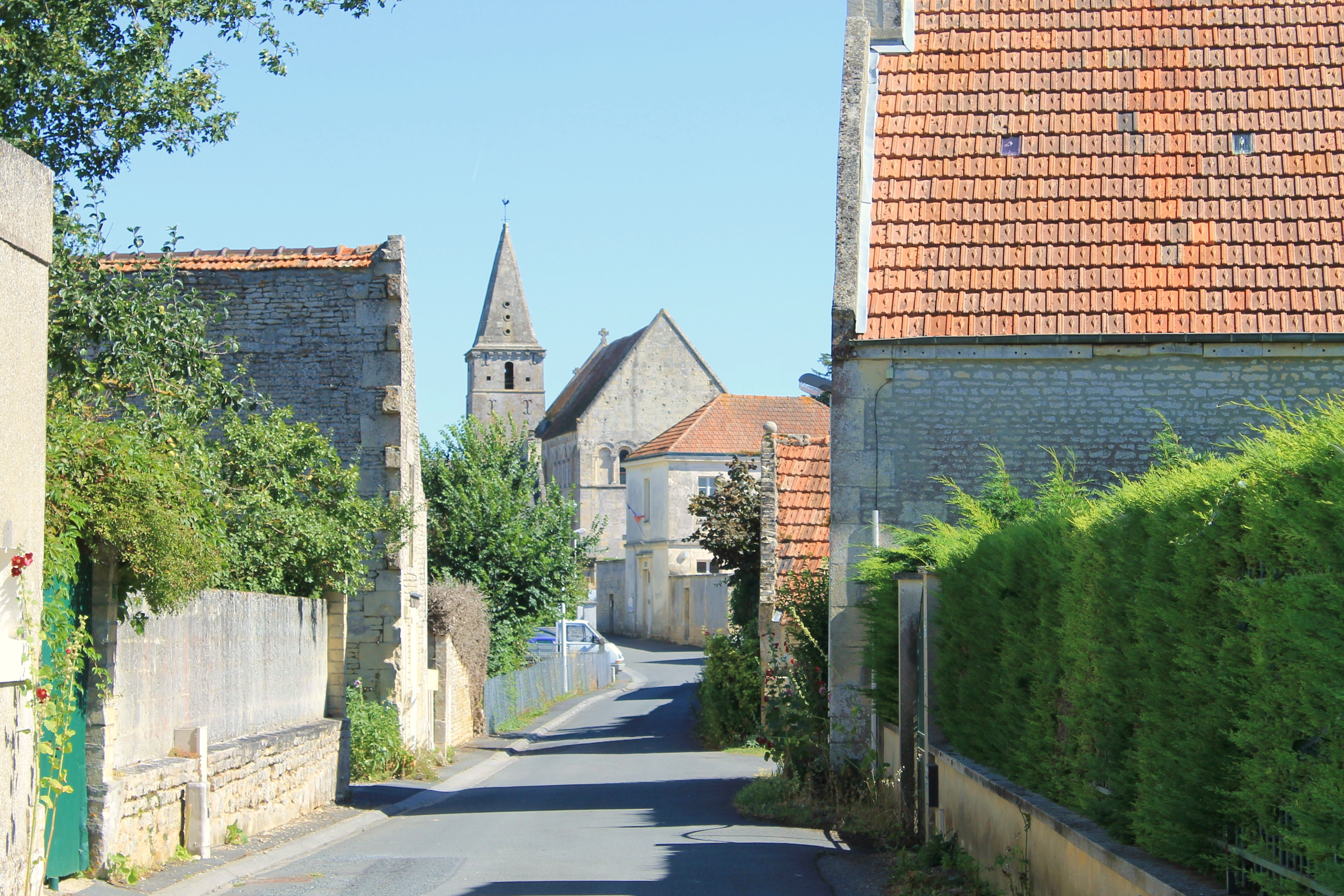
- A road in Cintheaux
- Location of Cintheaux
- Location within France Location within Normandy
- Coordinates: 49°03′22″N 0°17′27″W
- Country: France
- Region: Normandy
- Department: Calvados
- Arrondissement: Caen
- Canton: Le Hom
- Intercommunality: Cingal-Suisse Normande

Government
  - Mayor (2020–2026): Marcel Jaeger
- Area^{1}: 7.58 km^{2} (2.93 sq mi)
- Elevation: 118 m (387 ft)
- Highest elevation: 122 m (400 ft)
- Lowest elevation: 69 m (226 ft)
- Population (2023): 170
  - Density: 22/km^{2} (58/sq mi)
- Time zone: UTC+01:00 (CET)
  - Summer (DST): UTC+02:00 (CEST)
- INSEE/Postal code: 14160 /14680
- ^{1} French Land Register data, which excludes lakes, ponds, glaciers > 1 km^{2} (0.386 sq mi or 247 acres) and river estuaries.

Cintheaux (French pronunciation: [sɛ̃to]) is a commune in the Calvados department in the Normandy region in northwestern France.

== Geography ==
The commune is made up of the following collection of villages and hamlets, Robert Mesnil, Cintheaux and Gaumesnil. Gaumesnil was originally a separate village, now attached to Cintheaux; it has fewer than 19 residents.

== History ==
=== World War II ===
Cintheaux was devastated by Allied artillery, which sought to annihilate the 12th SS Panzer Division in 1944, during Operation Totalize.

== Points of Interest ==
- Bretteville-sur-Laize Canadian War Cemetery - the resting place of 2,793 Canadian soldiers who died in World war two.

=== National Heritage sites ===
The main town is situated around the church of Saint-Germain, classified as an official French historic monument in 1895. It was built around 1150 by the Marmion family; Robert Marmion offered it in patronage to the Barbery Abbey, subject to the Bayeux diocese, in 1181. The main (north) chapel and the cross tower, dating to the 16th century, was destroyed in 1688. The north bell tower was added in the 18th century. The church was restored between 1857 and 1902.

== Population ==
Historical population
Year	Pop.	±% p.a.
1968	172	—
1975	159	−1.12%
1982	161	+0.18%
1990	172	+0.83%
1999	180	+0.51%
2007	182	+0.14%
2012	193	+1.18%
2017	190	−0.31%
2023	170	−1.84%
Source: INSEE

== See also ==
- Communes of the Calvados department
