= The War Graves Photographic Project =

The War Graves Photographic Project is a project whose original aim was to photograph every war grave, individual memorial, Ministry of Defence grave, and family memorial of serving military personnel from WWI to the present day. However, due to its popularity the project has now extended the remit to cover all nationalities and military conflicts and make these available within a searchable database. These memorials are all over the world where British, Commonwealth and other nations servicemen and women are buried or commemorated.

Until June 2016 the project was working as a joint venture with the Commonwealth War Graves Commission, and assisting The Office of Australian War Graves, and the Veterans Affairs Canada and the New Zealand Ministry for Culture and Heritage this enables families, scholars and researchers to obtain, via the TWGPP website, copies of the photograph of a grave or memorial entry, which many older people are unable to visit. This service has only been made possible through the efforts of a dedicated group of volunteers from all walks of life.

In 2013 the Duke of Kent, President of the Commonwealth War Graves Commission, awarded the project with a commendation which read:

The War Graves Photographic Project is hereby awarded the Presidents Commendation for an outstanding contribution to the work and aims of the Commonwealth War Graves Commission. The award will be presented to Mr Steve Rogers, Project Coordinator, on behalf of all volunteers.

The Projects volunteers have proactively taken photographs of over 1.5 million graves and memorial inscriptions in the Commissions care and continue to provide thousands of these photographs to members of the public each year, many of them next of kin unable to travel to visit the grave or memorial in person. Images have been provided to the Commission for use on our website and in verifying records against the commemoration in situ The Projects work has become a vital component of our ongoing efforts to serve the public and to commemorate the fallen.

For an outstanding practical contribution to the work of the commission the Presidents Commendation is awarded to The War Graves Project Volunteers.

The project has a website with a searchable database. Copies of archived photographs (currently around 1,836,379 as of 5 May 2016) can be obtained, for a nominal administration fee, on request to the project.

Due to the sites growing popularity it now includes photographs of war and other service graves from conflicts pre 1914 and post World War II such as Korea, Aden and the Falklands. Other submissions also feature images from elsewhere in the world where military personnel were based or conflicts like the Anglo-South African War.

With the 100th anniversary of World War I taking place between 2014 and 2018 the project hoped to provide many images to families and researchers seeking their war dead from this period. 2016 included the big centennial anniversaries like the numerous individual battles that made up 'The Somme'. The likes of Delville Wood, High Wood, Pozieres, Thiepval and Ancre Heights to name but a few.
