= Canadian Cemetery No. 2 =

WWI cemetery in Pas-de-Calais, France

- Commonwealth War Graves Commission
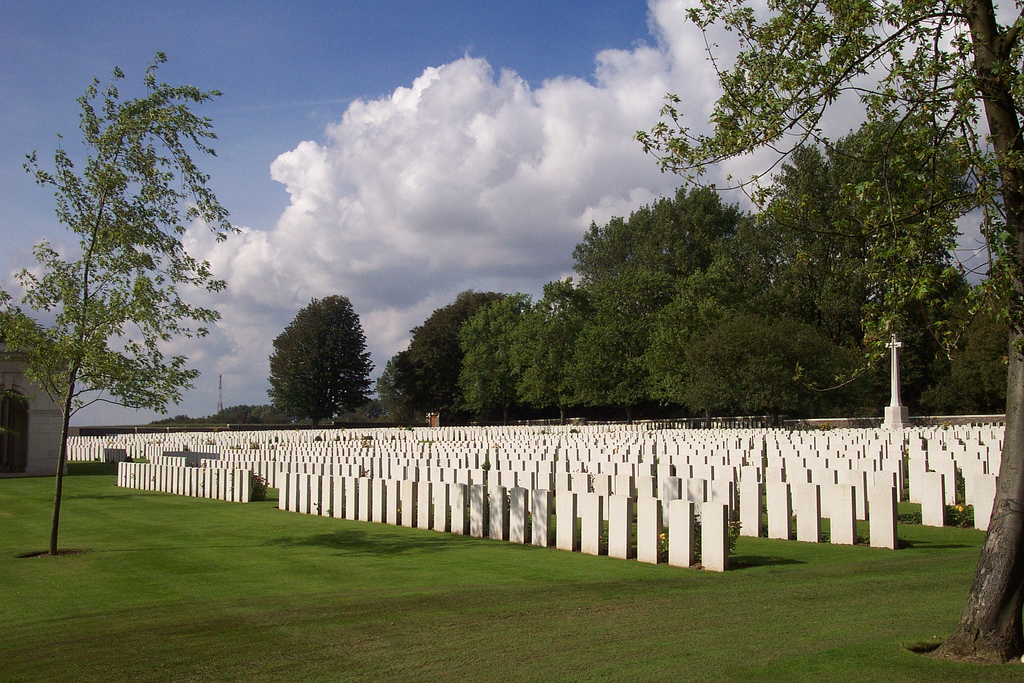
- Used for those deceased
- Established: April 1917
- Location: 50°22′38″N 2°45′51″E; Canadian National Vimy Memorial Park near Neuville-Saint-Vaast, France
- Total burials: 2,966
- Commemorated: 29

Burials by nation
- Allied Powers: United Kingdom: 2241; Canada: 695; Australia: 19; New Zealand: 7; South Africa: 2; India: 1

Burials by war
- World War I: 2965

UNESCO World Heritage Site
- Official name: Funerary and memory sites of the First World War (Western Front)
- Type: Cultural
- Criteria: i, ii, vi
- Designated: 2023 (45th session)
- Reference no.: 1567-PC04
- Statistics source: Cemetery details. Commonwealth War Graves Commission.Canadian Cemetery No. 2 at Find a Grave

Canadian Cemetery No. 2 is a Commonwealth War Graves Commission burial ground for the dead of World War I situated on the grounds of the Canadian National Vimy Memorial Park near the French town of Neuville-Saint-Vaast.

The cemetery was originally named CD 5 and established as a battlefield cemetery of the Canadian 4th Division for Canadian troops killed in the Battle of Vimy Ridge. Battlefield clearances of the surrounding area in 1919 significantly increased the size of the cemetery. The cemetery was again reopened for burials in 1931, receiving its last Canadian burial in 1947. Despite the cemetery's name, the large majority of the dead are British.

The cemetery now contains the graves of 2,966 Commonwealth soldiers, a large portion of which are unidentified. The cemetery covers an area of 10,869 square metres and is enclosed by low walls of coursed stone.

== Commemoration ==
Twenty-nine Canadian soldiers buried in 11th Canadian Infantry Brigade Cemetery and near Gunner's Crater, both in Givenchy-en-Gohelle, but whose graves are now lost are commemorated by special memorial headstones, inscribed to this effect.

== Notable graves ==
Private Charles Milligan, 10th Bn Cameronians (Scottish Rifles) was executed for desertion June 3, 1917. He is now buried in plot 19. A. 14.
