= 173rd Tunnelling Company =

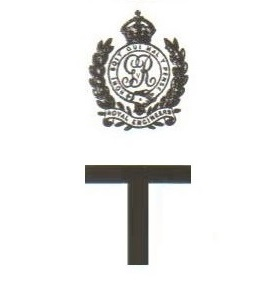
- Active: World War I
- Country: United Kingdom
- Branch: British Army
- Type: Royal Engineer tunnelling company
- Role: military engineering, tunnel warfare
- Nickname: "The Moles"
- Engagements: World War I Battle of Aubers Ridge; Battle of the Lys

The 173rd Tunnelling Company was one of the tunnelling companies of the Royal Engineers created by the British Army during World War I. The tunnelling units were occupied in offensive and defensive mining involving the placing and maintaining of mines under enemy lines, as well as other underground work such as the construction of deep dugouts for troop accommodation, the digging of subways, saps (a narrow trench dug to approach enemy trenches), cable trenches and underground chambers for signals and medical services. On 17 April 1915, 173rd Tunnelling Company became the first Royal Engineer tunnelling company to fire mines beneath enemy lines.

== Background ==
By January 1915 it had become evident to the BEF at the Western Front that the Germans were mining to a planned system. As the British had failed to develop suitable counter-tactics or underground listening devices before the war, field marshals French and Kitchener agreed to investigate the suitability of forming British mining units. Following consultations between the Engineer-in-Chief of the BEF, Brigadier George Fowke, and the mining specialist John Norton-Griffiths, the War Office formally approved the tunnelling company scheme on 19 February 1915.

Norton-Griffiths ensured that tunnelling companies numbers 170 to 177 were ready for deployment in mid-February 1915. In the spring of that year, there was constant underground fighting in the Ypres Salient at Hooge, Hill 60, Railway Wood, Sanctuary Wood, St Eloi and The Bluff which required the deployment of new drafts of tunnellers for several months after the formation of the first eight companies. The lack of suitably experienced men led to some tunnelling companies starting work later than others. The number of units available to the BEF was also restricted by the need to provide effective counter-measures to the German mining activities. To make the tunnels safer and quicker to deploy, the British Army enlisted experienced coal miners, many outside their nominal recruitment policy. The first nine companies, numbers 170 to 178, were each commanded by a regular Royal Engineers officer. These companies each comprised 5 officers and 269 sappers; they were aided by additional infantrymen who were temporarily attached to the tunnellers as required, which almost doubled their numbers. The success of the first tunnelling companies formed under Norton-Griffiths' command led to mining being made a separate branch of the Engineer-in-Chief's office under Major-General S.R. Rice, and the appointment of an 'Inspector of Mines' at the GHQ Saint-Omer office of the Engineer-in-Chief. A second group of tunnelling companies were formed from Welsh miners from the 1st and 3rd Battalions of the Monmouthshire Regiment, who were attached to the 1st Northumberland Field Company of the Royal Engineers, which was a Territorial unit. The formation of twelve new tunnelling companies, between July and October 1915, helped to bring more men into action in other parts of the Western Front.

Most tunnelling companies were formed under Norton-Griffiths' leadership during 1915, and one more was added in 1916. On 10 September 1915, the British government sent an appeal to Canada, South Africa, Australia and New Zealand to raise tunnelling companies in the Dominions of the British Empire. On 17 September, New Zealand became the first Dominion to agree the formation of a tunnelling unit. The New Zealand Tunnelling Company arrived at Plymouth on 3 February 1916 and was deployed to the Western Front in northern France. A Canadian unit was formed from men on the battlefield, plus two other companies trained in Canada and then shipped to France. Three Australian tunnelling companies were formed by March 1916, resulting in 30 tunnelling companies of the Royal Engineers being available by the summer of 1916.

== Unit history ==
=== Laventie ===
From its formation in March 1915 until the end of the war 173rd Tunnelling Company served under Second Army in the Ypres Salient. It moved into the Fauquissart area near Laventie in northern France.

=== Hill 60 ===
Mining and counter-mining had been going on at Hill 60 near Ypres for months before the formation of the first Royal Engineer tunnelling units. On 17 February 1915, British sappers at Hill 60 blew a small mine which they had taken over from the French, but without great effect. The Germans retaliated with a small mine at Zwarteleen, but were driven out of the British positions. On 21 February, however, they blew a large mine nearby, killing forty-seven men and ten officers of the 16th Lancers. In mid-March the Germans blew another large mine at Zwarteleen, creating a 9.1-metre (30 ft) deep crater and damaging their own lines in the process.

In spring 1915, the newly formed 173rd Tunnelling Company was given the job of undertaking a major mining operation beneath Hill 60. In the first British offensive underground attack operation in the Ypres Salient, they laid six mines by 10 April 1915, an operation planned by Major-General E. Bulfin, commander of the 28th Division and continued by the 5th Division when the 28th Division was relieved. Work beneath Hill 60 began early in March and three tunnels were begun towards the German line about 50 yards (46 m) away, a pit first having been dug some 16 feet (4.9 m) deep. Almost immediately the miners came upon dead bodies and quick-lime had to be brought over to cover them. By the time the work was finished, the tunnels stretched more than 100 yards (91 m). Two mines in the north were charged with 2,000 pounds (910 kg) of explosives each, two mines in the centre had 2,700 pounds (1,200 kg) charges and in the south one mine was packed with 500 pounds (230 kg) of guncotton, although work on it had been stopped when it ran close to a German tunnel. The explosive charges were ready on 15 April and on 17 April 1915 at 19:05 the mine group was fired.

=== Aubers Ridge ===
The unit was employed under the command of I Corps and the Indian Corps on operations in preparation for the Battle of Aubers Ridge on 9 May 1915, which formed part of the British contribution to the Second Battle of Artois (9 May – 18 June 1915). The Battle of Aubers Ridge marked only the second British use of specialist tunnelling companies, who tunnelled under no man's land and planted mines under the German defences to be blown at zero hour. 173rd Tunnelling Company was also extended to the Rue du Bois and Red Lamp areas soon afterwards.

=== Cuinchy 1915 ===
In summer 1915, the 173rd Tunnelling Company was employed under the command of the 2nd Division on operations near Cuinchy. 170th and 176th Tunnelling Company were also deployed under the 2nd Division at that time.

=== Loos 1916/17 ===
In January 1916, the 173rd Tunnelling Company moved to the Hulluch-Loos area. The unit began sinking shafts and driving galleries to counter an enemy mining initiative immediately to the south and east of Loos. When 255th Tunnelling Company was formed the same month, some experienced officers and men from 173rd Tunnelling Company were attached to the new unit.

From January 1916 to April 1917, 173rd Tunnelling Company waged war underground on three levels ("Main", "Deep", "Deep Deep") in the Hill 70 - Copse - Double Crassier area of Loos, supported by the newly raised 258th Tunnelling Company which deployed in April 1916. This mining sector, together with Hulluch to the North, was then taken over by 3rd Australian Tunnelling Company until September 1918. By that time the enemy mining threat had ceased completely and the front was relatively quiet.

=== Ypres Salient ===
In spring of 1917, 173rd Tunnelling Company moved to the Ypres Canal sector near Boezinge where it commenced work on the dugout at Yorkshire Trench. This was an addition to the existing fortification; it was a first line trench for about one year between summer or autumn 1916 until the summer of 1917. The completed Yorkshire Trench dugout then served as headquarters for the 13th and 16th Battalions of the Royal Welch Fusiliers at the start of the Battle of Passchendaele later that year. The BEF had decided to carry out all operations in the offensive of summer 1917 from deep dugouts. East of the Ypres Canal in the close vicinity of Yorkshire Trench there were several more dugouts, seven of which - all south and southeast of Yorkshire Trench - were finished by the 173rd or 179th Tunnelling Companies. Of these, Yorkshire Trench, Butt 18, Nile Trench and Heading Lane Dugout were double battalion headquarters, Bridge 6 was a brigade headquarters, and Lancashire Farm Dugout contained two battalion and two brigade headquarters. The condition of the ground made digging the deep dugouts extremely difficult and dangerous. Work had to be carried out silently and secretly, facing an observant enemy who was only a few hundred metres away. About 180 dugout sites have been located in the Ypres Salient and in the 1990s some of them were entered, at least in part. Yorkshire Trench was rediscovered by amateur archaeologists and systematically excavated in 1998. Although the area is now part of a large industrial estate, the location was opened to the public in 2003 (see aerial photo of the site). Yorkshire Trench is located close to the John McCrae memorial site at Essex Farm.

=== Spring Offensive ===
In March 1918, the 173rd Tunnelling Company were working alongside 177th Tunnelling Company on the Fifth Army's Green Line near Wiencourt on the Somme when the German spring offensive (21 March – 18 July 1918) opened, and were ordered to halt an uncontrolled retreat by Allied units on the Guillaucourt-Marcelcave road. 253rd Tunnelling Company were also involved in the latter operation.

173rd Tunnelling Company played an important role in destroying the Somme bridges in an attempt to slow the enemy advance. On 25 March 1918, personnel of the unit were converted into infantry – called No 2 RE Battalion – for emergency purposes, along with other Royal Engineers troops from XIX Corps (see 258th Tunnelling Company).

In April 1918, the 173rd and several other tunnelling companies (171st, 183rd, 184th, 255th, 258th and 3rd Australian) were forced to move from their camps at Boeschepe, when the enemy broke through the Lys positions during the Spring Offensive. These units were then put on duties that included digging and wiring trenches over a long distance from Reningelst to near Saint-Omer. The operation to construct these fortifications between Reningelst and Saint-Omer was carried out jointly by the British 171st, 173rd, 183rd, 184th, 255th, 258th, 3rd Canadian and 3rd Australian Tunnelling Companies.

=== Armistice ===
After the Armistice of 11 November 1918, Captain D. Richards MC of the 173rd Tunnelling Company became the last officer of a tunnelling company of the Royal Engineers to leave French soil.

== See also ==
- Mine warfare

== Bibliography ==
- Edmonds, J. E. (1928). Military Operations France and Belgium, 1915: Battles of Aubers Ridge, Festubert, and Loos. History of the Great War Based on Official Documents By Direction of the Historical Section of the Committee of Imperial Defence. Vol. II (1st ed.). London: Macmillan. OCLC 58962526.
- Edmonds, J. E.; Wynne, G. C. (1995) [1927]. Military Operations France and Belgium, 1915: Winter 1914–15 Battle of Neuve Chapelle: Battles of Ypres. History of the Great War Based on Official Documents by Direction of the Historical Section of the Committee of Imperial Defence. Vol. I (Imperial War Museum and Battery Press repr. ed.). London: Macmillan. ISBN 978-0-89839-218-0.
- Holt, Tonie; Holt, Valmai (2004) [2004]. Major & Mrs Holt's Concise Illustrated Battlefield Guide: The Western Front-North. Barnsley: Pen & Sword Books. ISBN 0-85052-933-6.
- Jones, Simon (2010). Underground Warfare 1914–1918. Pen & Sword Military. ISBN 978-1-84415-962-8.
