= 3rd Australian Tunnelling Company =

Australian military unit (1916–1919)

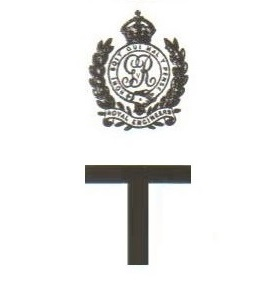
- Active: 1916–1919
- Country: Australia
- Branch: Australian Imperial Force
- Type: Royal Engineer tunnelling company
- Role: Military engineering Tunnel warfare
- Nickname: "The Diggers"
- Engagements: World War I: Battle of the Lys

The 3rd Australian Tunnelling Company was one of the tunnelling companies of the Royal Australian Engineers during World War I. The tunnelling units were occupied in offensive and defensive mining involving the placing and maintaining of mines under enemy lines, as well as other underground work such as the construction of deep dugouts for troop accommodation, the digging of subways, saps (a narrow trench dug to approach enemy trenches), cable trenches and underground chambers for signals and medical services.

== Background ==
By January 1915, it had become evident to the BEF at the Western Front that the Germans were mining to a planned system. As the British had failed to develop suitable counter-tactics or underground listening devices before the war, field marshals French and Kitchener agreed to investigate the suitability of forming British mining units. Following consultations between the Engineer-in-Chief of the BEF, Brigadier George Fowke, and the mining specialist John Norton-Griffiths, the War Office formally approved the tunnelling company scheme on 19 February 1915.

Norton-Griffiths ensured that tunnelling companies numbers 170 to 177 were ready for deployment in mid-February 1915. In the spring of that year, there was constant underground fighting in the Ypres Salient at Hooge, Hill 60, Railway Wood, Sanctuary Wood, St Eloi and The Bluff which required the deployment of new drafts of tunnellers for several months after the formation of the first eight companies. The lack of suitably experienced men led to some tunnelling companies starting work later than others. The number of units available to the BEF was also restricted by the need to provide effective counter-measures to the German mining activities. To make the tunnels safer and quicker to deploy, the British Army enlisted experienced coal miners, many outside their nominal recruitment policy. The first nine companies, numbers 170 to 178, were each commanded by a regular Royal Engineers officer. These companies each comprised 5 officers and 269 sappers; they were aided by additional infantrymen who were temporarily attached to the tunnellers as required, which almost doubled their numbers. The success of the first tunnelling companies formed under Norton-Griffiths' command led to mining being made a separate branch of the Engineer-in-Chief's office under Major-General S.R. Rice, and the appointment of an 'Inspector of Mines' at the GHQ Saint-Omer office of the Engineer-in-Chief. A second group of tunnelling companies were formed from Welsh miners from the 1st and 3rd Battalions of the Monmouthshire Regiment, who were attached to the 1st Northumberland Field Company of the Royal Engineers, which was a Territorial unit. The formation of twelve new tunnelling companies, between July and October 1915, helped to bring more men into action in other parts of the Western Front. Most British tunnelling companies were formed under Norton-Griffiths' leadership during 1915, and one more was added in 1916.

On 10 September 1915, the British government sent an appeal to Canada, South Africa, Australia and New Zealand to raise tunnelling companies in the Dominions of the British Empire. On 17 September, New Zealand became the first Dominion to agree the formation of a tunnelling unit. The New Zealand Tunnelling Company arrived at Plymouth on 3 February 1916 and was deployed to the Western Front in northern France. The Royal Australian Engineers formed four mining units – initially grouped into the Australian Mining Corps – for the British Expeditionary Force, all of which were operational by March 1916. Three were specialist companies of tunnellers (1st, 2nd, 3rd), while the Australian Electrical Mechanical Boring and Mining Company was tasked with carrying out related repairs. A Canadian tunnelling unit was formed from men on the battlefield, plus two other companies trained in Canada and then shipped to France, resulting in 30 tunnelling companies being available by the summer of 1916.

== Unit history ==
=== Formation ===
In early 1915, while the Royal Australian Engineers were deployed in Egypt, the battalion-sized "Australian Mining Corps" was assembled from men with a background in civilian mining. The intention was to employ this unit, which was at that time about 1,000 strong, with the ANZAC at Gallipoli, but instead it was moved to France in May 1916, where it also appeared as the "Australian Mining Battalion". Soon after arriving in western Europe in May 1916, the battalion was split into three tunnelling and one repairs company, and the corps headquarters dissolved.

=== Laventie ===
Shortly after its formation, the 3rd Australian Tunnelling Company relieved the 255th Tunnelling Company in May 1916 in the Laventie-Fauquissart sector in northern France.

=== Loos ===
In early November 1916, the 3rd Australian Tunnelling Company moved to northern France where it took over the Hill 70 – Copse – Double Crassier area of Loos, together with Hulluch to the north, and relieved the 173rd and 258th Tunnelling Companies, which had been waging war underground on three levels ("Main", "Deep", "Deep Deep") there.

"In the south-eastern minefield the Germans blew a camouflet on November 27 1916 which caught twenty two of the Australians, the Australians had no chance whatsoever." Whilst engaged in mining on 27 November 1916 an incident occurred in the Black Watch Shaft on Hill 70 which resulted in the deaths of 20 enlisted men and the gassing of one officer and a further 8 enlisted men. Lt O.R. HOWIE was awarded a Military Cross for his actions during and after the incident.

Fierce tunnelling battles recommenced with the Australians and Germans firing camouflets and continuing the underground battles until past Christmas Day 1916.

By the end of their time there the 3rd Australian Tunnelling Company in the Loos-Hulluch sector reported that the enemy mining threat had ceased completely and the front was relatively quiet. By 7 February 1918, the 3rd Australian Tunnelling Company was engaged in trench shelter and tunnel construction in a quarry near Loos, between Loos Crassier and the Lens-Bethune road, and on 17 February 1918, a trench excavated by the 3rd Australian Tunnelling Company was photographed near Loos.

=== Spring Offensive ===
In April 1918, the 3rd Australian and several other tunnelling companies (171st, 173rd, 183rd, 184th, 255th and 258th) were forced to move from their camps at Boeschepe, when the enemy broke through the Lys positions during the German spring offensive. These units were then put on duties that included digging and wiring trenches over a long distance from Reningelst to near Saint-Omer. The operation to construct these fortifications between Reningelst and Saint-Omer was carried out jointly by the British 171st, 173rd, 183rd, 184th, 255th, 258th, 3rd Canadian and 3rd Australian Tunnelling Companies. On 10 April, detachments of 3rd Australian Tunnelling Company and F Special (Gas) Company, RE, were thrown into the line to help 101st Brigade attempting to halt the German advance at Nieppe.

During the great advance to victory in Autumn 1918, the 3rd Australian Tunnelling Company constructed a road bridge at Moudit under shell fire.

== See also ==
- Mine warfare
