= 184th Tunnelling Company =

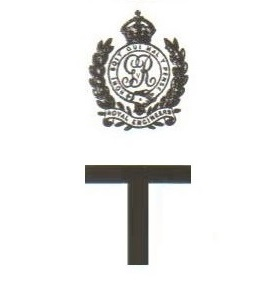
- Active: October 1915–June 1919
- Country: United Kingdom
- Branch: British Army
- Type: Royal Engineer tunnelling company
- Role: military engineering, tunnel warfare
- Nickname: "The Moles"
- Engagements: World War I Battle of the Lys; Fifth Battle of Ypres

The 184th Tunnelling Company was one of the tunnelling companies of the Royal Engineers created by the British Army during World War I. The tunnelling units were occupied in offensive and defensive mining involving the placing and maintaining of mines under enemy lines, as well as other underground work such as the construction of deep dugouts for troop accommodation, the digging of subways, saps (a narrow trench dug to approach enemy trenches), cable trenches and underground chambers for signals and medical services.

== Background ==
By January 1915 it had become evident to the BEF at the Western Front that the Germans were mining to a planned system. As the British had failed to develop suitable counter-tactics or underground listening devices before the war, field marshals French and Kitchener agreed to investigate the suitability of forming British mining units. Following consultations between the Engineer-in-Chief of the BEF, Brigadier George Fowke, and the mining specialist John Norton-Griffiths, the War Office formally approved the tunnelling company scheme on 19 February 1915.

Norton-Griffiths ensured that tunnelling companies numbers 170 to 177 were ready for deployment in mid-February 1915. In the spring of that year, there was constant underground fighting in the Ypres Salient at Hooge, Hill 60, Railway Wood, Sanctuary Wood, St Eloi and The Bluff which required the deployment of new drafts of tunnellers for several months after the formation of the first eight companies. The lack of suitably experienced men led to some tunnelling companies starting work later than others. The number of units available to the BEF was also restricted by the need to provide effective counter-measures to the German mining activities. To make the tunnels safer and quicker to deploy, the British Army enlisted experienced coal miners, many outside their nominal recruitment policy. The first nine companies, numbers 170 to 178, were each commanded by a regular Royal Engineers officer. These companies each comprised 5 officers and 269 sappers; they were aided by additional infantrymen who were temporarily attached to the tunnellers as required, which almost doubled their numbers. The success of the first tunnelling companies formed under Norton-Griffiths' command led to mining being made a separate branch of the Engineer-in-Chief's office under Major-General S.R. Rice, and the appointment of an 'Inspector of Mines' at the GHQ Saint-Omer office of the Engineer-in-Chief. A second group of tunnelling companies were formed from Welsh miners from the 1st and 3rd Battalions of the Monmouthshire Regiment, who were attached to the 1st Northumberland Field Company of the Royal Engineers, which was a Territorial unit. The formation of twelve new tunnelling companies, between July and October 1915, helped to bring more men into action in other parts of the Western Front.

Most tunnelling companies were formed under Norton-Griffiths' leadership during 1915, and one more was added in 1916. On 10 September 1915, the British government sent an appeal to Canada, South Africa, Australia and New Zealand to raise tunnelling companies in the Dominions of the British Empire. On 17 September, New Zealand became the first Dominion to agree the formation of a tunnelling unit. The New Zealand Tunnelling Company arrived at Plymouth on 3 February 1916 and was deployed to the Western Front in northern France. A Canadian unit was formed from men on the battlefield, plus two other companies trained in Canada and then shipped to France. Three Australian tunnelling companies were formed by March 1916, resulting in 30 tunnelling companies of the Royal Engineers being available by the summer of 1916.

== Unit history ==
184th Tunnelling Company included a significant number of miners from South Wales, as did the 170th, 171st, 172nd, 253rd and 254th Tunnelling Company.

=== Somme ===
184th Tunnelling Company was formed in Rouen in October 1915, moved immediately to the Somme area, for work at Maricourt. From its formation until the end of the war the company served under Second Army.

=== Vimy 1916 ===
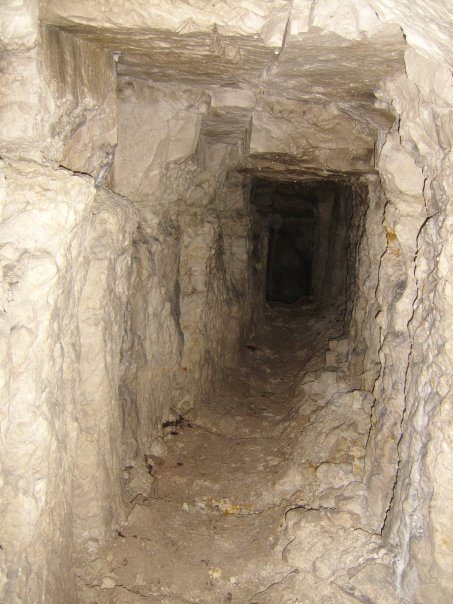
British-dug fighting tunnel in Vimy sector

By spring 1916, the 184th Tunnelling Company was active at Vimy, an area of busy underground activity for much of the war. British tunnellers progressively took over mining in the area from the French between February and May 1916. In addition to 184th Tunnelling Company, other units active around Vimy were 172nd, 175th, 176th, 182nd and 185th Tunnelling Companies. From spring 1916, the British had deployed five tunnelling companies along the Vimy Ridge, and during the first two months of their tenure in the area, 70 mines were fired, mostly by the Germans. Between October 1915 and April 1917 an estimated 150 French, British and German charges were fired in this 7 kilometres (4.3 mi) sector of the Western Front. In May 1916, a German infantry attack, which forced the British back 640 metres (700 yd), was aimed at neutralising British mining activity by capturing the shaft entrances. From June 1916, however, the Germans withdrew many miners to work on the Hindenburg Line and also for work in coal mines in Germany. In the second half of 1916 the British constructed strong defensive underground positions, and from August 1916, the Royal Engineers developed a mining scheme to support a large-scale infantry attack on the Vimy Ridge proposed for autumn 1916, although this was subsequently postponed. After September 1916, when the Royal Engineers had completed their network of defensive galleries along most of the front line, offensive mining largely ceased although activities continued until 1917. The British gallery network beneath Vimy Ridge eventually grew to a length of 12 kilometres (7.5 mi).

The Canadian Corps was posted to the northern part of Vimy Ridge in October 1916 and preparations for an attack were revived in February 1917. Prior to the Battle of Vimy Ridge (9 – 12 April 1917), the British tunnelling companies secretly laid a series of explosive charges under German positions in an effort to destroy surface fortifications before the assault. The original plan had called for 17 mines and 9 Wombat charges to support the infantry attack, of which 13 (possibly 14) mines and 8 Wombat charges were eventually laid. At the same time, 19 crater groups existed along this section of the Western Front, each with several large craters. In order to assess the consequences of infantry having to advance across cratered ground after a mining attack, officers from the Canadian Corps visited La Boisselle and Fricourt where the mines on the first day of the Somme had been blown. Their reports and the experience of the Canadians at St Eloi in April 1916 – where mines had so altered and damaged the landscape as to render occupation of the mine craters by the infantry all but impossible –, led to the decision to remove offensive mining from the central sector allocated to the Canadian Corps at Vimy Ridge. Further British mines in the area were vetoed following the blowing by the Germans on 23 March 1917 of nine craters along no man's land as it was probable that the Germans were aiming to restrict an Allied attack to predictable points. The three mines already laid by 172nd Tunnelling Company were also dropped from the British plans. They were left in place after the assault and were only removed in the 1990s. Another mine, prepared by 176th Tunnelling Company against the German strongpoint known as the Pimple, was not completed in time for the attack. The gallery had been pushed silently through the clay, avoiding the sandy and chalky layers of the Vimy Ridge, but by 9 April 1917 was still 21 metres (70 ft) short of its target. In the end, two mines were blown before the attack, while three mines and two Wombat charges were fired to support the attack, including those forming a northern flank.

=== Arras 1916/17 ===
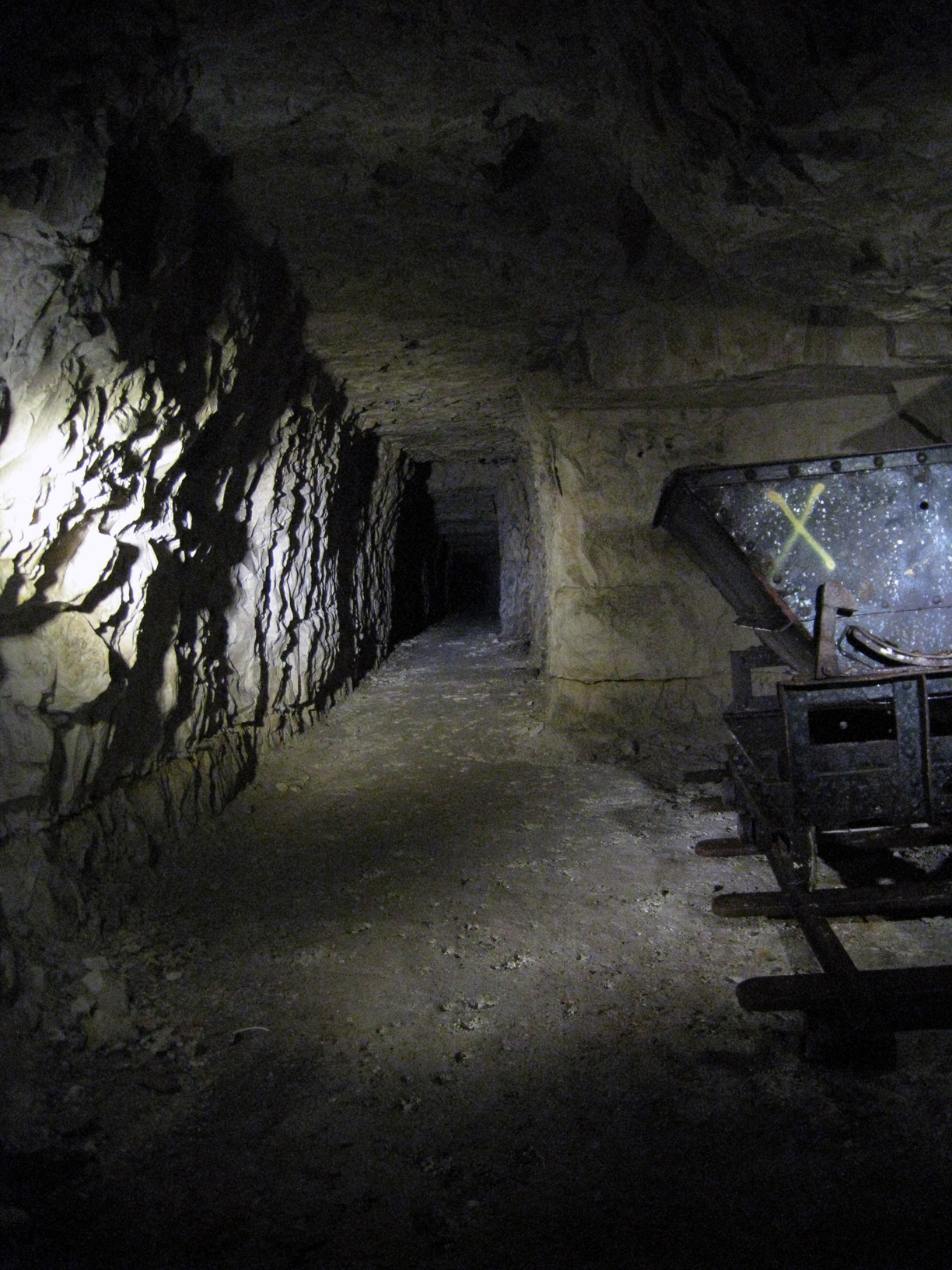
Tunnel and mining trolley in Carrière Wellington

Before the Battle of Arras (9 April – 16 May 1917), the 184th Tunnelling Company were engaged in Arras on Fish Avenue Tunnel, and in helping construct emplacements for heavy mortars. The British forces controlling Arras had decided to re-use the ancient underground quarries in the town to aid a planned offensive against the Germans, whose trenches ran through what are now the eastern suburbs of the town. The underground quarries were to be linked up by tunnels so that they could be used both as shelters from the incessant German shelling and as a means of conveying troops to the front in secrecy and safety. From October 1916, the tunnelling companies of the Royal Engineers had been constructing tunnels for the troops, focusing on Carrière Wellington, a former underground quarry in Ronville near Arras. The New Zealand Tunnelling Company had carried out a first exploration of the underground quarries in the Ronville and Saint-Sauveur districts of Arras on 5 November 1916. While the New Zealanders were moving into place, the 184th Tunnelling Company began work on connection tunnels at Saint-Sauveur on 25 November 1916. The scale of this undertaking was enormous: in one sector alone four Tunnelling Companies (of 500 men each) worked around the clock in 18-hour shifts for two months. By the end of January 1917, the Royal Engineers had constructed 20 kilometres of tunnels linking the ancient underground quarries of Arras. The tunnel system could accommodate 24,000 men and was equipped with running water, electric light, kitchens, latrines, a small power station and a medical centre with a fully equipped operating theatre.

=== Passchendaele 1917 ===
184th Tunnelling Company moved to Nieuwpoort in June 1917. Worked on underground shelters along the coast to De Panne. 184th Tunnelling Company then moved to Ypres-Brielen sector to prepare tank crossings over Ypres canal for attack on 31 July 1917, the beginning of the Battle of Passchendaele. In connection with that battle, the unit helped six fighting tanks (of 8 Company, C Battalion, with 15th Division, XIX Corps, 5th Army) cross the Steenbeek on 22 August 1917. On that day, 8 Company had 10 fighting tanks and two supply tanks in action.

=== German spring offensive ===
In April 1918, the 184th and several other tunnelling companies (171st, 173rd, 183rd, 255th, 258th and 3rd Australian) were forced to move from their camps at Boeschepe, when the enemy broke through the Lys positions during the German spring offensive. These units were then put on duties that included digging and wiring trenches over a long distance from Reningelst to near Saint-Omer. The operation to construct these fortifications between Reningelst and Saint-Omer was carried out jointly by the British 171st, 173rd, 183rd, 184th, 255th, 258th, 3rd Canadian and 3rd Australian Tunnelling Companies.

=== Ypres 1918 ===
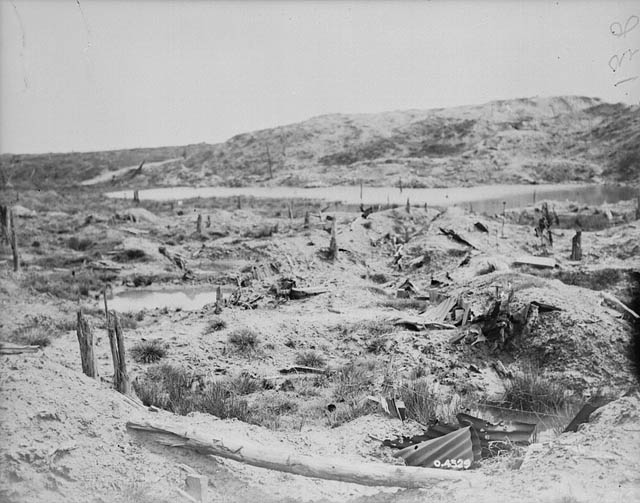
The Bluff, photographed just after the war.

On 28 September 1918 Second Army launched a surprise attack to break out of the Ypres Salient. 43rd Brigade of 14th (Light) Division was tasked with advancing along both sides of the Ypres–Comines Canal. 12th Battalion, Suffolk Regiment, on the north bank, was faced with capturing 'The Bluff'. This spoil heap from the construction of the canal had been fought over on the surface and underground since early 1915, and was covered with shell and mine craters. In the words of the Official History, it 'bristled with machine guns and was expected to prove troublesome'. In the event the battalion followed a dense Creeping barrage and outflanked the Bluff, after which the defenders fled. The battalion was followed onto its objective by a half section of 184th Tunnelling Company, whose role was to examine and clear the maze of tunnels and deep dugouts beneath the Bluff. No infantry were allowed to enter any dugout until the tunnellers and their escorts had gone in to examine them and had disarmed any mines or boobytraps, erecting signs reading 'Examined' or 'Dangerous'. At least 14 tunnels and dugouts were known to be present, and four of these were found to be mined and had to be made safe.

== See also ==
- Mine warfare

== Bibliography ==
- Peter Barton, Peter Doyle & Johan Vandewalle, Beneath Flanders Fields - The Tunnellers' War 1914-1918, Staplehurst: Spellmount, ISBN 978-1-86227237-8
- Boire, Michael (1992). "The Underground War: Military Mining Operations in support of the attack on Vimy Ridge, 9 April 1917" (PDF). Canadian Military History. 1 (1–2). Laurier Centre for Military Strategic and Disarmament Studies: 15–24. ISSN 1195-8472. Archived from the original (PDF) on 5 March 2009.
- Brig-Gen Sir James E. Edmonds & Lt-Col R. Maxwell-Hyslop, History of the Great War: Military Operations, France and Belgium 1918, Vol V, 26th September–11th November, The Advance to Victory, London: HM Stationery Office, 1947/Imperial War Museum and Battery Press, 1993, ISBN 1-870423-06-2/Uckfield: Naval & Military Press, 2021, ISBN 978-1-78331-624-3.
- Jones, Simon (2010). Underground Warfare 1914–1918. Pen & Sword Military. ISBN 978-1-84415-962-8.
- Jonathan Nicholls, Cheerful Sacrifice: The Battle of Arras 1917. Pen and Sword Books, 2005,ISBN 1-84415-326-6.
- Murphy, Charles Cecil Rowe (1928). The History of the Suffolk Regiment, 1914-1927. London: Hutchinson. OCLC 13429897.
- Paul Reed, Battleground Europe: Walking the Salient, Barnsley: Leo Cooper, 1999, ISBN 0-85052-617-5.
- Graham E. Watson & Richard A. Rinaldi, The Corps of Royal Engineers: Organization and Units 1889–2018, Tiger Lily Books, 2018, ISBN 978-171790180-4.
- Ritchie Wood, Miners at War 1914-1919: South Wales Miners in the Tunnelling Companies on the Western Front (Wolverhampton Military Studies), Solihull: Helion and Company, 2016, ISBN 978-1-91109649-8.
