= 255th Tunnelling Company =

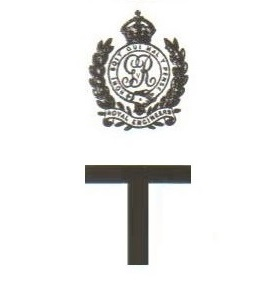
- Active: World War I
- Country: United Kingdom
- Branch: British Army
- Type: Royal Engineer tunnelling company
- Role: military engineering, tunnel warfare
- Nickname: "The Moles"
- Engagements: World War I Battle of Vimy Ridge; Battle of the Lys

The 255th Tunnelling Company was one of the tunnelling companies of the Royal Engineers created by the British Army during World War I. The tunnelling units were occupied in offensive and defensive mining involving the placing and maintaining of mines under enemy lines, as well as other underground work such as the construction of deep dugouts for troop accommodation, the digging of subways, saps (a narrow trench dug to approach enemy trenches), cable trenches and underground chambers for signals and medical services.

== Background ==
By January 1915 it had become evident to the BEF at the Western Front that the Germans were mining to a planned system. As the British had failed to develop suitable counter-tactics or underground listening devices before the war, field marshals French and Kitchener agreed to investigate the suitability of forming British mining units. Following consultations between the Engineer-in-Chief of the BEF, Brigadier George Fowke, and the mining specialist John Norton-Griffiths, the War Office formally approved the tunnelling company scheme on 19 February 1915.

Norton-Griffiths ensured that tunnelling companies numbers 170 to 177 were ready for deployment in mid-February 1915. In the spring of that year, there was constant underground fighting in the Ypres Salient at Hooge, Hill 60, Railway Wood, Sanctuary Wood, St Eloi and The Bluff which required the deployment of new drafts of tunnellers for several months after the formation of the first eight companies. The lack of suitably experienced men led to some tunnelling companies starting work later than others. The number of units available to the BEF was also restricted by the need to provide effective counter-measures to the German mining activities. To make the tunnels safer and quicker to deploy, the British Army enlisted experienced coal miners, many outside their nominal recruitment policy. The first nine companies, numbers 170 to 178, were each commanded by a regular Royal Engineers officer. These companies each comprised 5 officers and 269 sappers; they were aided by additional infantrymen who were temporarily attached to the tunnellers as required, which almost doubled their numbers. The success of the first tunnelling companies formed under Norton-Griffiths' command led to mining being made a separate branch of the Engineer-in-Chief's office under Major-General S.R. Rice, and the appointment of an 'Inspector of Mines' at the GHQ Saint-Omer office of the Engineer-in-Chief. A second group of tunnelling companies were formed from Welsh miners from the 1st and 3rd Battalions of the Monmouthshire Regiment, who were attached to the 1st Northumberland Field Company of the Royal Engineers, which was a Territorial unit. The formation of twelve new tunnelling companies, between July and October 1915, helped to bring more men into action in other parts of the Western Front.

Most tunnelling companies were formed under Norton-Griffiths' leadership during 1915, and one more was added in 1916. On 10 September 1915, the British government sent an appeal to Canada, South Africa, Australia and New Zealand to raise tunnelling companies in the Dominions of the British Empire. On 17 September, New Zealand became the first Dominion to agree the formation of a tunnelling unit. The New Zealand Tunnelling Company arrived at Plymouth on 3 February 1916 and was deployed to the Western Front in northern France. A Canadian unit was formed from men on the battlefield, plus two other companies trained in Canada and then shipped to France. Three Australian tunnelling companies were formed by March 1916, resulting in 30 tunnelling companies of the Royal Engineers being available by the summer of 1916.

== Unit history ==
=== Neuve-Chapelle ===
255th Tunnelling Company was formed in January 1916, taking some officers and men from 173rd Tunnelling Company, and moved into Red Lamp-Neuve-Chapelle sector.

=== Laventie ===
255th Tunnelling Company next saw action in the Laventie-Fauquissart sector in northern France, where 173rd Tunnelling Company had earlier been employed. 255th Tunnelling Company was relieved there by the 3rd Australian Tunnelling Company in May 1916.

=== Givenchy ===
In May 1916, 255th Tunnelling Company was relieved in the Laventie-Fauquissart sector, and in turn relieved the 180th Tunnelling Company in the Givenchy area, where it remained for much of 1916. From July 1916 until November 1918 it served under First Army.

=== Battle of Vimy Ridge ===
255th Tunnelling Company was next engaged in digging of subways to the Vimy front in early 1917, specifically in the Calonne-Souchez area. At this time the 255th also constructed two 50,000-gallon underground water reservoirs, for the supply of forward troops in the Vimy attack of April 1917.

The units active around Vimy were the 172nd, 175th, 176th, 182nd, 184th, 185th and 255th Tunnelling Companies.

=== Givenchy ===
Late in 1917, at least part of 255th Tunnelling Company was working in tunnels near the Sunken Road, Givenchy.

=== Spring Offensive ===
In April 1918, the 255th and several other tunnelling companies (171st, 173rd, 183rd, 184th, 258th and 3rd Australian) were forced to move from their camps at Boeschepe, when the enemy broke through the Lys positions during the German spring offensive. These units were then put on duties that included digging and wiring trenches over a long distance from Reningelst to near Saint-Omer. The operation to construct these fortifications between Reningelst and Saint-Omer was carried out jointly by the British 171st, 173rd, 183rd, 184th, 255th, 258th, 3rd Canadian and 3rd Australian Tunnelling Companies.

== See also ==
- Mine warfare
