= 183rd Tunnelling Company =

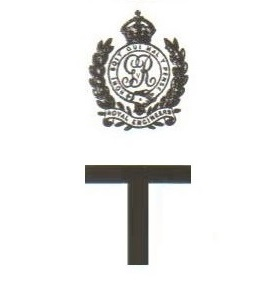
- Active: World War I
- Country: United Kingdom
- Branch: British Army
- Type: Royal Engineer tunnelling company
- Role: military engineering, tunnel warfare
- Nickname: "The Moles"
- Engagements: World War I Battle of the Somme; Battle of Messines; Battle of Passchendaele; Battle of the Lys

Commanders
- Notable commanders: Horace Hickling

The 183rd Tunnelling Company was one of the tunnelling companies of the Royal Engineers created by the British Army during World War I. The tunnelling units were occupied in offensive and defensive mining involving the placing and maintaining of mines under enemy lines, as well as other underground work such as the construction of deep dugouts for troop accommodation, the digging of subways, saps (a narrow trench dug to approach enemy trenches), cable trenches and underground chambers for signals and medical services.

== Background ==
By January 1915 it had become evident to the BEF at the Western Front that the Germans were mining to a planned system. As the British had failed to develop suitable counter-tactics or underground listening devices before the war, field marshals French and Kitchener agreed to investigate the suitability of forming British mining units. Following consultations between the Engineer-in-Chief of the BEF, Brigadier George Fowke, and the mining specialist John Norton-Griffiths, the War Office formally approved the tunnelling company scheme on 19 February 1915.

Norton-Griffiths ensured that tunnelling companies numbers 170 to 177 were ready for deployment in mid-February 1915. In the spring of that year, there was constant underground fighting in the Ypres Salient at Hooge, Hill 60, Railway Wood, Sanctuary Wood, St Eloi and The Bluff which required the deployment of new drafts of tunnellers for several months after the formation of the first eight companies. The lack of suitably experienced men led to some tunnelling companies starting work later than others. The number of units available to the BEF was also restricted by the need to provide effective counter-measures to the German mining activities. To make the tunnels safer and quicker to deploy, the British Army enlisted experienced coal miners, many outside their nominal recruitment policy. The first nine companies, numbers 170 to 178, were each commanded by a regular Royal Engineers officer. These companies each comprised 5 officers and 269 sappers; they were aided by additional infantrymen who were temporarily attached to the tunnellers as required, which almost doubled their numbers. The success of the first tunnelling companies formed under Norton-Griffiths' command led to mining being made a separate branch of the Engineer-in-Chief's office under Major-General S.R. Rice, and the appointment of an 'Inspector of Mines' at the GHQ Saint-Omer office of the Engineer-in-Chief. A second group of tunnelling companies were formed from Welsh miners from the 1st and 3rd Battalions of the Monmouthshire Regiment, who were attached to the 1st Northumberland Field Company of the Royal Engineers, which was a Territorial unit. The formation of twelve new tunnelling companies, between July and October 1915, helped to bring more men into action in other parts of the Western Front.

Most tunnelling companies were formed under Norton-Griffiths' leadership during 1915, and one more was added in 1916. On 10 September 1915, the British government sent an appeal to Canada, South Africa, Australia and New Zealand to raise tunnelling companies in the Dominions of the British Empire. On 17 September, New Zealand became the first Dominion to agree the formation of a tunnelling unit. The New Zealand Tunnelling Company arrived at Plymouth on 3 February 1916 and was deployed to the Western Front in northern France. A Canadian unit was formed from men on the battlefield, plus two other companies trained in Canada and then shipped to France. Three Australian tunnelling companies were formed by March 1916, resulting in 30 tunnelling companies of the Royal Engineers being available by the summer of 1916.

== Unit history ==
183rd Tunnelling Company was formed in Rouen, northern France, in October 1915. From its formation until the end of the war the company served under Third Army.

=== The Somme 1915/16 ===
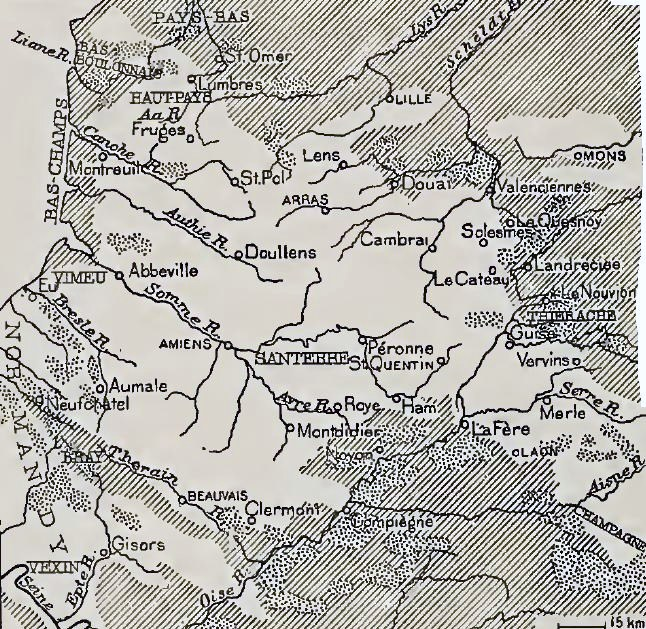
Map of chalk areas in northern France

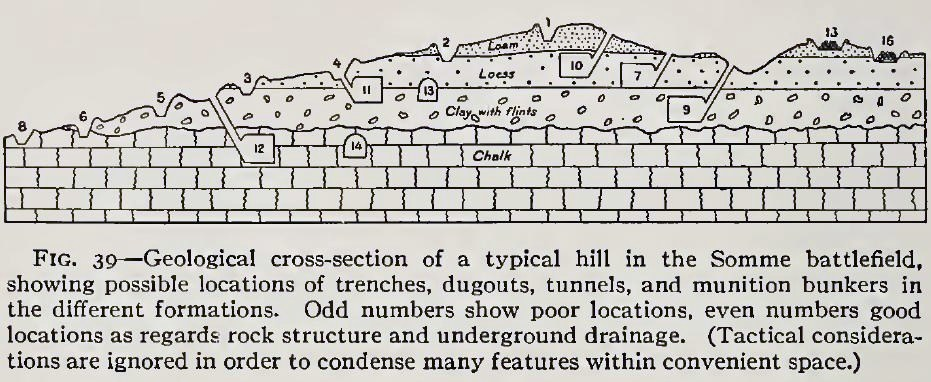
Geological cross-section of the Somme battlefield

After its formation, the unit proceeded to Fontaine-lès-Cappy, south of the Somme. Moved to Carnoy-Maricourt to prepare mines and saps for Sir Henry Rawlinson's Fourth Army and its attack on the Somme on 1 July 1916. In the Somme sector of the Western Front, local but very fierce underground fighting had taken place in the winter of 1914 and spring of 1915 at La Boisselle, Fricourt, Bois Français and Carnoy. Fowke moved the 174th and 183rd Tunnelling Companies there to relieve the French engineers, but the British did not have enough miners to take over the large number of French shafts and the French agreed to leave their engineers at work for several weeks. To provide the tunnellers needed, the British formed the 178th and 179th Tunnelling Companies in August 1915, followed by the 185th and 252nd Tunnelling Companies in October. The 181st Tunnelling Company was also present on the Somme.

As Allied preparations were under way for the Battle of the Somme (1 July – 18 November 1916), the tunnelling companies were to make two major contributions by placing 19 large and small mines beneath the German positions along the front line and by preparing a series of shallow Russian saps from the British front line into no man's land, which would be opened at zero hour and allow the infantry to attack the German positions from a comparatively short distance. Under the command of Captain Horace Hickling, 183rd Tunnelling Company placed four mines (the Mametz East group) in the front sector allocated to XV Corps near Mametz and three mines (the Carnoy group) in the front sector allocated to XIII Corps near Carnoy.

The Mametz East group consisted of four mines: Bulgar Point, a heavily wired German strong work facing the 1st Battalion South Staffordshire Regiment's attack south-east of Mametz, was mined with 910 kilograms (2,000 lb) of explosives; a sap further west was loaded with a 91-kilogram (200 lb) charge in support of the Gordon Highlanders' attack; and two more 230-kilogram (500 lb) mines were laid beneath Austrian Trench, on the extreme right of the 7th Division's sphere of action, on the boundary with the front sector allocated to XIII Corps.

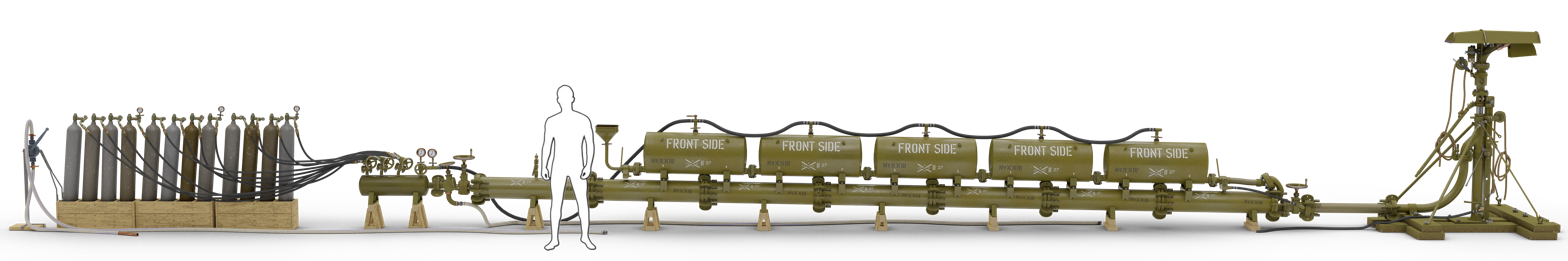
Livens Large Gallery Flame Projector

In addition to placing the four mines near Mametz, 183rd Tunnelling Company from February 1916 onwards prepared dozens of Russian saps in the front sector allocated to XV Corps, which ran from the British front line to the very edge of the German positions. Small charges could be blown from the end of these tunnels and they could then be used to reinforce the captured positions. Four saps were further equipped with Livens Large Gallery Flame Projectors, ready to cover the German front line with liquid fire. In order to protect them from enemy fire, the flame throwers were hauled into the saps just hours before the battle. Two tunnels which housed such weapons – located at Kiel Trench south-west of Mametz, and between Carnoy and Kasino Point – were damaged by German shellfire before the attack. The two remaining were put to use from saps immediately left of the mine crater field at Carnoy. In view of the work required, 183rd Tunnelling Company took a calculated risk by stopping its defensive mining activities between Carnoy and Fricourt, which had so far guaranteed the underground safety of the British trenches in that area. By 1 July, the British tunnel network excavated in this sector extended 91 metres (300 ft) under no man's land.

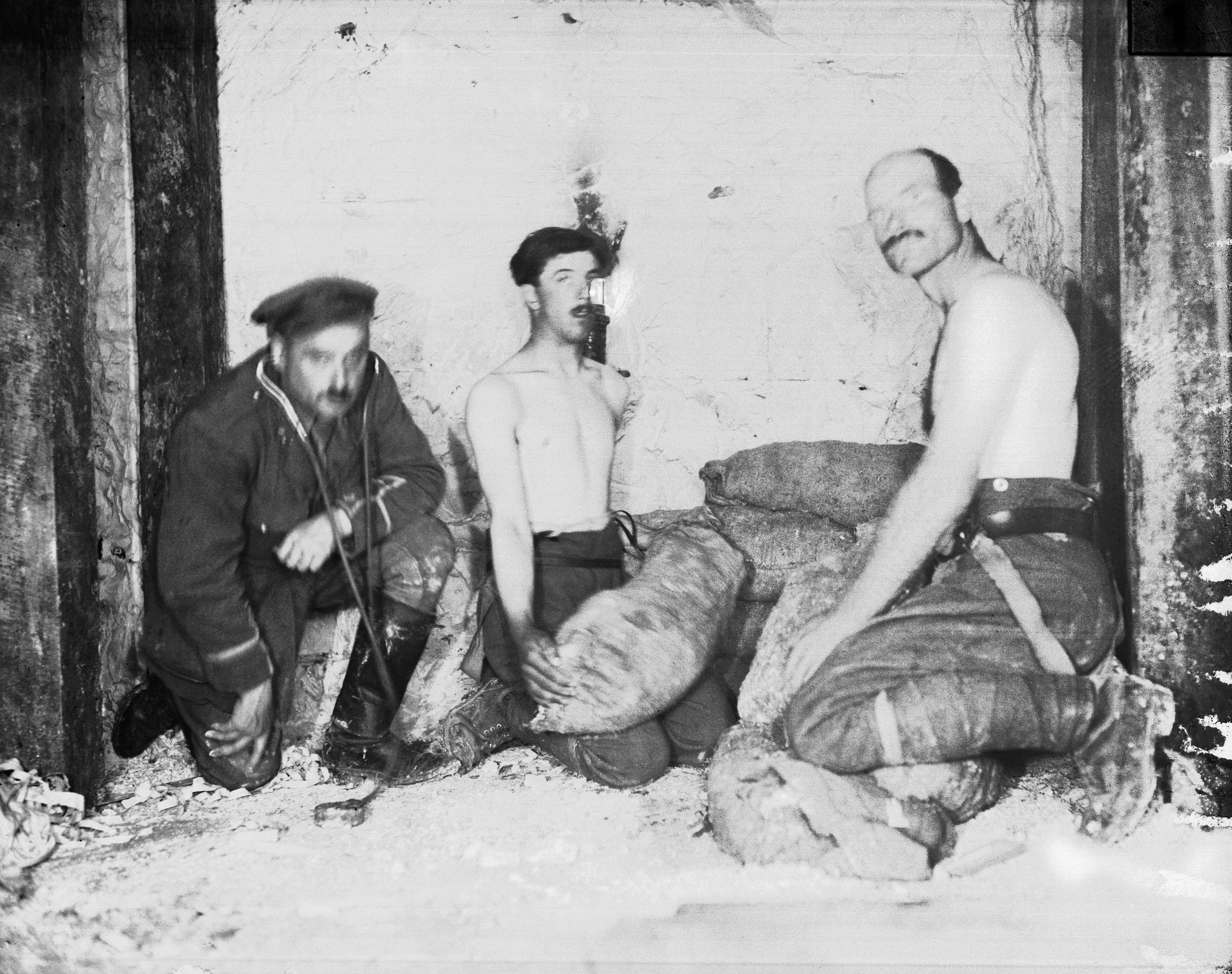
Miners laying charges for one of the mines on the Somme, 1–13 July 1916.

The Carnoy group consisted of three mines. Two were to be fired north of Carnoy on 1 July 1916 at 07.27 hours, a 2,300-kilogram (5,000 lb) charge under a German salient at Kasino Point and a 230-kilogram (500 lb) charge on the extreme left flank, intended to collapse German dug outs and destroy machine-gun nests. The third mine also held a 230-kilogram (500 lb) charge. Underground fighting at Carnoy had taken place in the winter of 1914 and spring of 1915, and mine warfare directly in front of Carnoy, near the Carnoy–Montauban road, was conducted by both sides from May 1916. As in the Mametz East sector, 183rd Tunnelling Company had to stop its defensive mining activities so the work in the Carnoy sector could be finished in time. All deep mining was halted, except at Kasino Point where an inclined gallery was built. As the chalk grew harder, the method of softening involved drilling holes with a carpenter's auger, into which the miners poured vinegar. When it was fired, the mine produced a crater with lips 30 metres (97 ft) in diameter and 9.1 metres (30 ft) deep. The miners reported after the attack on the First day on the Somme that the Kasino Point mine had buried three German dugouts and four sniper's posts, and probably a machine-gun emplacement as well. During tunnelling at Kasino Point, the British broke into a German dugout but were able to cover it up before the breach was noticed. Edmonds wrote in 1932 that this incident occurred during the digging of Russian saps rather than the Kasino Point mine. Middlebrook wrote in 1971 that the Kasino Point Salient was between Mametz, Carnoy and Montauban and the mine planted there was one of seven large mines that were due to be detonated on 1 July.

=== Messines 1916/17 ===
As part of the preparations for the Battle of Messines in June 1917, the 183rd Tunnelling Company began work on deep dugouts in the Ypres Salient. The Battle of Messines was a prelude to the much larger Third Battle of Ypres (31 July–10 November 1917). The underground building activities of the Royal Engineer units consisted of a series of deep mines dug by the British 171st, 175th, 250th, 1st Canadian, 3rd Canadian and 1st Australian Tunnelling companies to be fired at the start of the Battle of Messines (7–14 June 1917), while the British 183rd, 2nd Canadian and 2nd Australian Tunnelling companies built underground shelters in the Second Army area. The mines at Messines were detonated on 7 June 1917, creating 19 large craters.

=== Spring Offensive 1918 ===
In April 1918, the 183rd and several other tunnelling companies (171st, 173rd, 184th, 255th, 258th and 3rd Australian) were forced to move from their camps at Boeschepe, when the enemy broke through the Lys positions during the German spring offensive. These units were then put on duties that included digging and wiring trenches over a long distance from Reningelst to near Saint-Omer. The operation to construct these fortifications between Reningelst and Saint-Omer was carried out jointly by the British 171st, 173rd, 183rd, 184th, 255th, 258th, 3rd Canadian and 3rd Australian Tunnelling Companies.

== See also ==
- Tunnel warfare

== Bibliography ==
- Edmonds, J. E. (1993) [1932]. Military Operations France and Belgium, 1916: Sir Douglas Haig's Command to the 1st July: Battle of the Somme. History of the Great War Based on Official Documents by Direction of the Historical Section of the Committee of Imperial Defence. Vol. I (Imperial War Museum and Battery Press ed.). London: Macmillan. ISBN 978-0-89839-185-5.
- Edmonds, J. E. (1991) [1948]. Military Operations France and Belgium, 1917: 7 June – 10 November: Messines and Third Ypres (Passchendaele). History of the Great War Based on Official Documents by Direction of the Historical Section of the Committee of Imperial Defence. Vol. II (Imperial War Museum and Battery Press ed.). London: HMSO. ISBN 0-89839-166-0.
- Jones, Simon (2010). Underground Warfare 1914–1918. Pen & Sword Military. ISBN 978-1-84415-962-8.
- Middlebrook, M. (1971). The First Day on the Somme. London: Penguin Books. ISBN 978-0-14-139071-0.
- Stedman, M. (2011) [1997]. Somme: Fricourt–Mametz. Battleground Europe. London: Leo Cooper. ISBN 978-0-85052-574-8.
