= William Henry Johnston =

Recipient of the Victoria Cross

- Born: 21 December 1879; Leith, Edinburgh, Scotland
- Died: 8 June 1915 (aged 35); St. Eloi, Belgium
- Burial place: Perth Cemetery (China Wall)
- Military career
- Allegiance: United Kingdom
- Branch: British Army
- Service years: 1899–1915 †
- Rank: Major
- Units: Royal Engineers
- Conflicts: World War I: Western Front; Race to the Sea; Second Battle of Ypres †
- Awards: Victoria Cross

William Henry Johnston VC (21 December 1879 – 8 June 1915) was a British soldier and recipient of the Victoria Cross, the highest and most prestigious award for gallantry in the face of the enemy that can be awarded to British and Commonwealth forces.

Born 21 December 1879 in Leith, Edinburgh to Maj. William Johnston and Mary Johnston. Johnston was a captain in the 59th Field Company, Corps of Royal Engineers, British Army. He was 34 years old, on 14 September 1914 during the Race to the Sea at Missy, France, in the First World War, he performed an act of bravery for which he was awarded the Victoria Cross.

His citation read:

At Missy, on 14th Sept., under a heavy fire all day until 7 p.m., worked with his own hand two rafts bringing back wounded and returning with ammunition; thus enabling advanced Brigade to maintain its position across the river.

— The London Gazette, No. 28985, 25 November 1914

Johnston afterwards served with the tunnelling companies of the Royal Engineers at St Eloi in the Ypres Salient. Mining activity by the Royal Engineers began at St Eloi in early 1915. The Germans exploded mines under the area known as The Mound just south-east of St Eloi in March 1915 and in the ensuing fighting the British suffered some 500 casualties. A month later, on 14 April 1915, the Germans fired another mine producing a crater over 20 metres (66 ft) in diameter. Much of the British tunnelling in this sector was done by the 177th and 172nd Tunnelling Company, the latter commanded in early 1915 by Captain William Henry Johnston VC. Johnston left 172nd Tunnelling Company in early May and was killed in action at Ypres on 8 June 1915. He eventually achieved the rank of major.

His Victoria Cross is displayed at the Royal Engineers Museum, Chatham, Kent.
