= Spring R. Rice =

British Army general

Major-General Sir Spring R. Rice KCMG CB
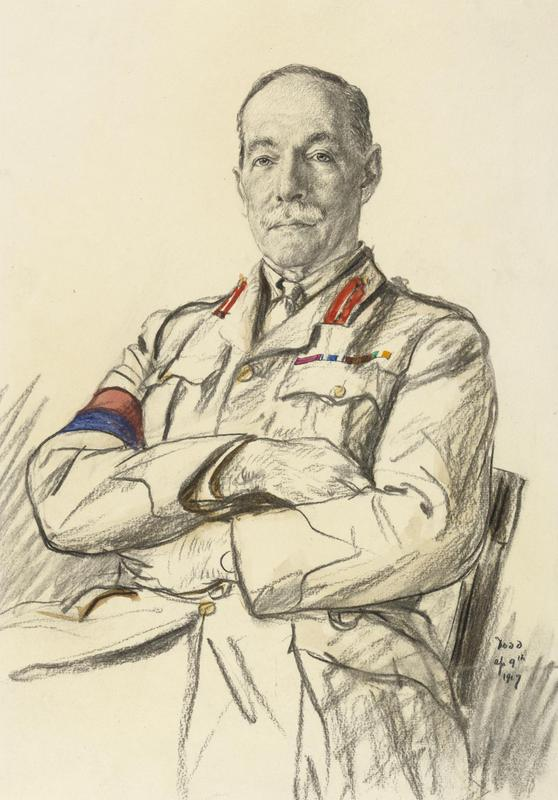
- 1917 portrait by Francis Dodd
- Born: 11 July 1858
- Died: 11 August 1929 (aged 71); Steyning, Sussex, England
- Military career
- Allegiance: United Kingdom
- Branch: British Army
- Service years: 1877–1919
- Rank: Major-General
- Conflicts: South African War; First World War
- Awards: Knight Commander of the Order of St Michael and St George; Companion of the Order of the Bath; Mentioned in dispatches (10); Croix de Guerre; Commander of the Order of Leopold (Belgium)

Major-General Sir Spring Robert Rice, KCMG, CB (11 July 1858 – 11 August 1929) was a British Army general who was on the staff of the British Expeditionary Force during the First World War.

== Biography ==
After graduating from the Royal Military Academy, Woolwich, Rice was commissioned as a lieutenant into the Royal Engineers in October 1877, and was promoted to captain in 1888. He was appointed the adjutant of the School of Military Engineering in 1892, and promoted to major in 1896.

During the South African War he commanded 23rd Field Company RE, deployed to Ladysmith; during the Siege of Ladysmith, he acted as the commanding officer of the Royal Engineers. In 1901, he designed a simple and inexpensive blockhouse, which saw extensive use. For his services during the war, he was mentioned in despatches four times, received the Queen's Medal with two clasps and the King's medal with two clasps, and was given a brevet promotion to lieutenant colonel in the South African honours list published on 26 June 1902.

He left the School of Military Engineering in 1905, and was appointed the chief engineer in charge of coastal defences for Southern Command in 1909, with the rank of colonel. In 1911 he was appointed as the chief engineer of Aldershot Command, holding this post until 1914.

On the outbreak of the First World War, he was appointed to the post of Brigadier-General Royal Engineers in I Corps, the senior engineering officer of the corps. He was promoted to major general in February 1915 for distinguished service, and in February 1916 he was appointed Engineer-in-Chief of the entire BEF, succeeding G. H. Fowke. He picked up the trial project to form the Royal Engineer tunnelling companies, forming them into a distinct branch within the Corps.

He was transferred to the Forts Garrison Command in 1917, a posting he held for the remainder of the war. He retired in 1919, having been mentioned in despatches a further six times, awarded the Knight Commander of the Order of St Michael and St George and the Croix de Guerre, and made a Commander of the Order of Leopold for his wartime service. He was a first-class cricket player and played for the Royal Engineers in 1878 and 1879.
