= Sanctuary Wood Cemetery =

WWI CWGC cemetery in Ypres, Belgium

- Commonwealth War Graves Commission
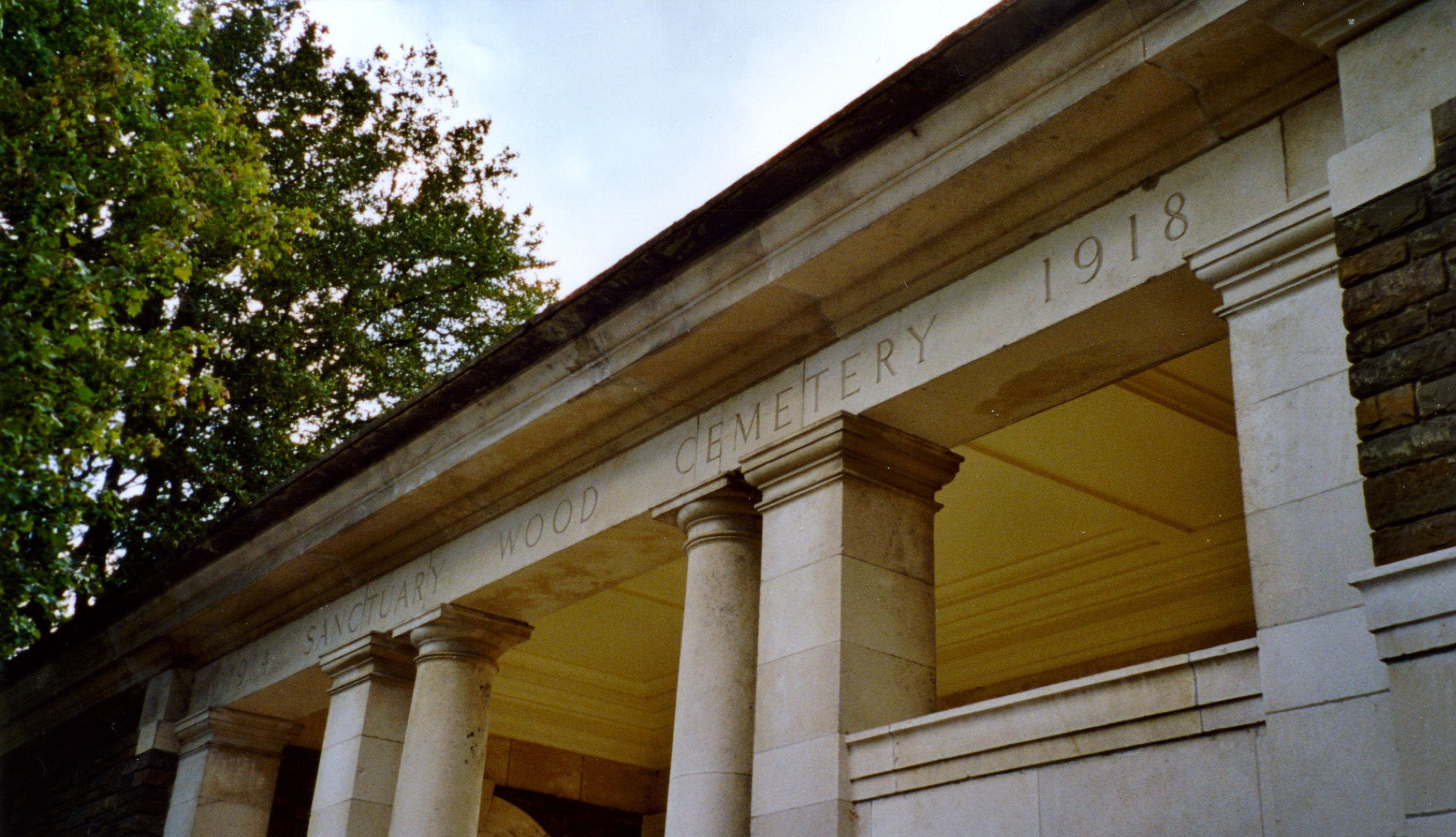
- Used for those deceased 1914–1917
- Established: 1915
- Location: 50.83842°N 2.94422°E near 5 km east of Ypres, West Flanders, Belgium
- Designed by: Sir Edwin Lutyens
- Total burials: 1,989 buried or commemorated
- Unknowns: 1,353

Burials by nation
- Australia = 88 (55 unidentified) Canada = 142 (unidentified 70); Newfoundland = 3 (2 unidentified); Germany = 1 Great Britain = 1734 (unidentified 1214); New Zealand = 18 (14 unidentified) South Africa = 3

Sanctuary Wood Cemetery is a Commonwealth War Graves Commission (CWGC) cemetery for the dead of the First World War, 5 km east of Ypres, Belgium, near Hooge in the municipality of Zillebeke. Located off the main Ypres-Menin Road on Canadalaan (Canada Lane). The Canadian Hill 62 Memorial is 100 metres further down the road from the cemetery.

Sanctuary Wood itself was named by British troops in November 1914 when it was used to shelter troops. Fighting took place in it in September 1915 and it was fought over by Canadian and German soldiers during the Battle of Mount Sorrel in early June 1916. Three small Commonwealth cemeteries were established in it between May and August 1915 but were largely obliterated during the Battle of Mount Sorrel. When the war finished, traces of one of them were found, containing 137 graves, and became the core of the present Sanctuary Wood Cemetery. It was greatly expanded between 1927 and 1932 with graves being moved in from surrounding areas, with a few being moved from as far away as Nieuwpoort. The majority of these graves were from the battles around Ypres in 1914 and the Allied offensive in late 1917.

One of the 637 identified graves belongs to Lieutenant Gilbert Talbot of the Rifle Brigade (Plot 1, Row G), in whose memory Talbot House at Poperinghe was established in December 1915 by two army chaplains, Talbot's brother Neville Talbot and Philip 'Tubby' Clayton.

Just outside the cemetery is a Celtic cross, with an engraved sword on top, a memorial to Second Lieutenant Thomas Keith Hedley Rae. He was killed on 20 July 1915 at Hooge, and the memorial was built there in 1921, but transferred to its present location in the 1960s.

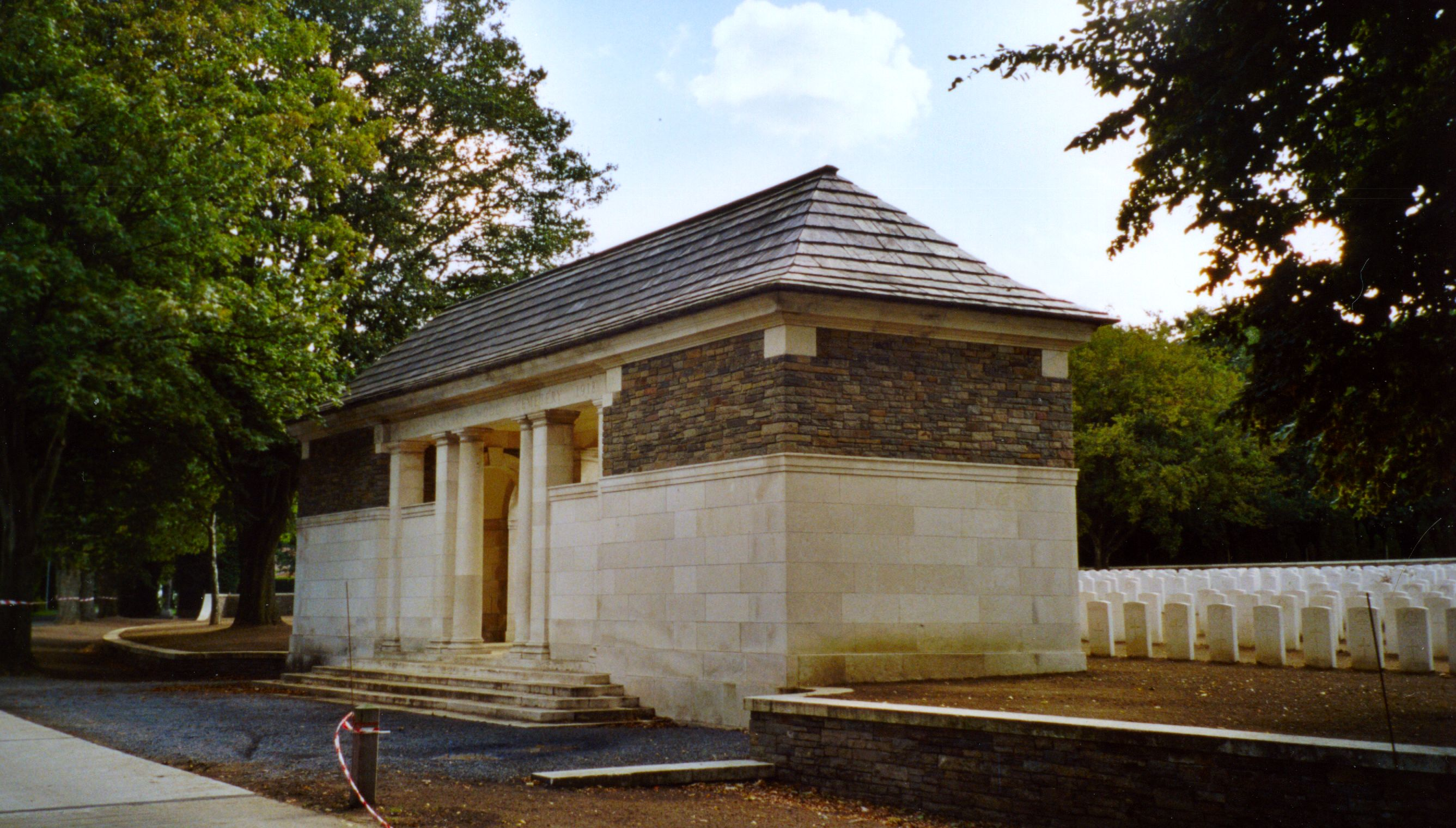
Entrance pavilion

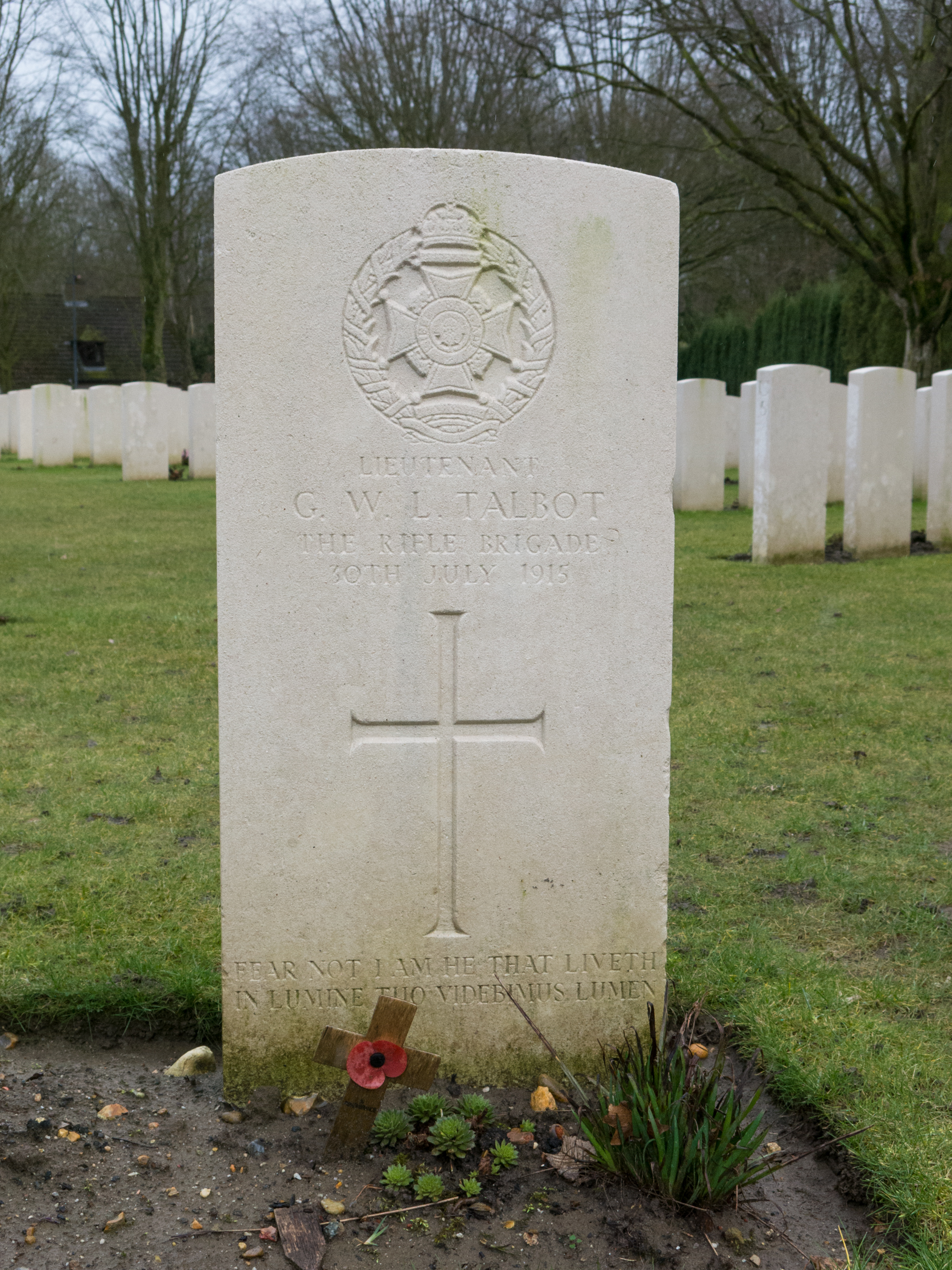
Headstone of Gilbert Talbot

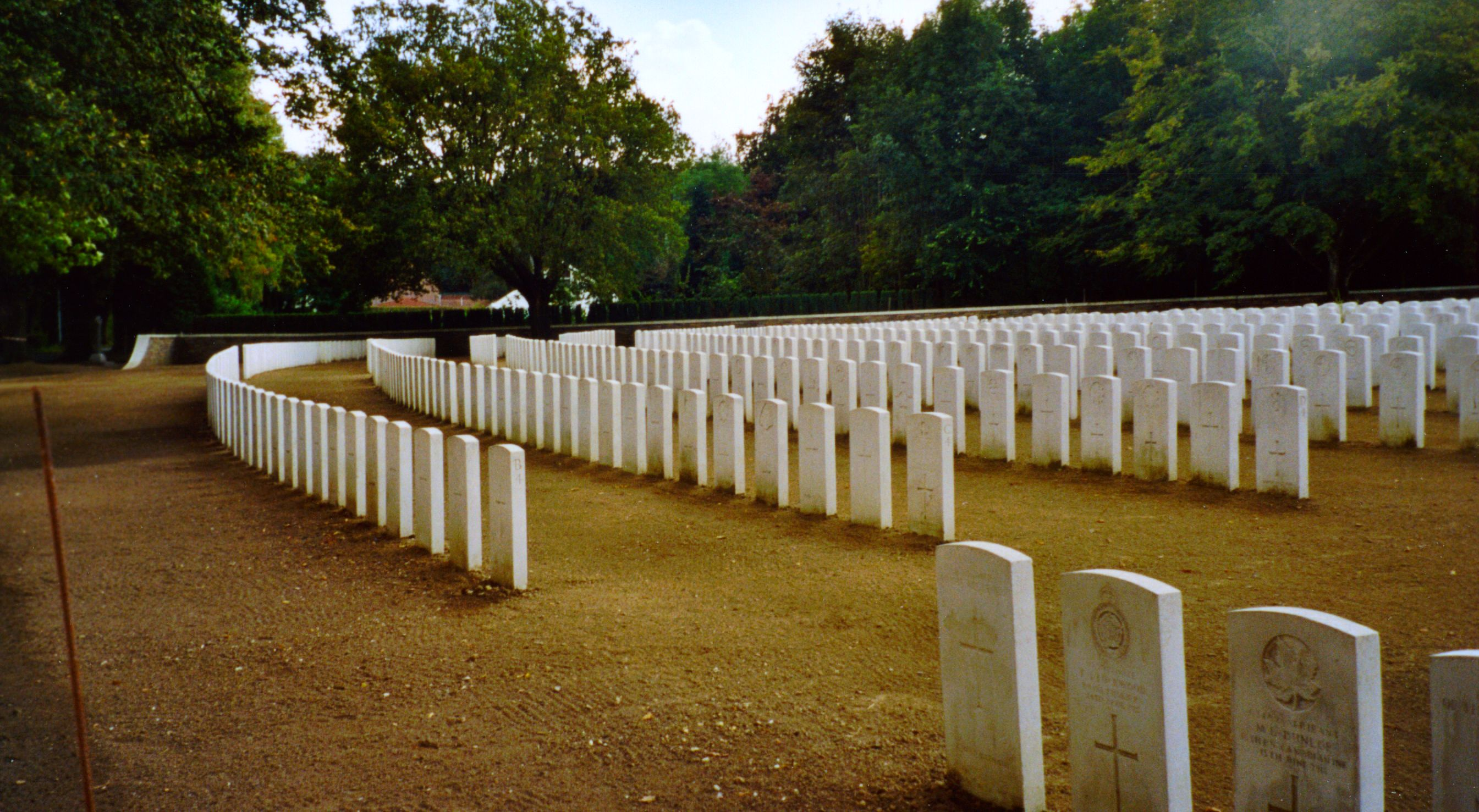
Turf replacement in 2006

== See also ==
- Sanctuary Wood Museum Hill 62
