= 252nd Tunnelling Company =

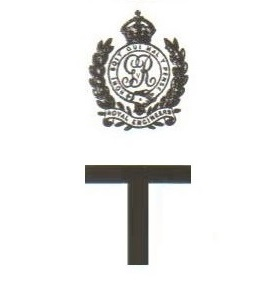
- Active: World War I
- Country: United Kingdom
- Branch: British Army
- Type: Royal Engineer tunnelling company
- Role: military engineering, tunnel warfare
- Nickname: "The Moles"
- Engagements: World War I Battle of the Somme; German spring offensive

The 252nd Tunnelling Company was one of the tunnelling companies of the Royal Engineers created by the British Army during World War I. The tunnelling units were occupied in offensive and defensive mining involving the placing and maintaining of mines under enemy lines, as well as other underground work such as the construction of deep dugouts for troop accommodation, the digging of subways, saps (a narrow trench dug to approach enemy trenches), cable trenches and underground chambers for signals and medical services. 252nd Tunnelling Company is particularly known for creating the Hawthorn Ridge mine during the Battle of the Somme 1916, which formed part of a series of mines that were placed beneath the German lines.

== Background ==
By January 1915 it had become evident to the BEF at the Western Front that the Germans were mining to a planned system. As the British had failed to develop suitable counter-tactics or underground listening devices before the war, field marshals French and Kitchener agreed to investigate the suitability of forming British mining units. Following consultations between the Engineer-in-Chief of the BEF, Brigadier George Fowke, and the mining specialist John Norton-Griffiths, the War Office formally approved the tunnelling company scheme on 19 February 1915.

Norton-Griffiths ensured that tunnelling companies numbers 170 to 177 were ready for deployment in mid-February 1915. In the spring of that year, there was constant underground fighting in the Ypres Salient at Hooge, Hill 60, Railway Wood, Sanctuary Wood, St Eloi and The Bluff which required the deployment of new drafts of tunnellers for several months after the formation of the first eight companies. The lack of suitably experienced men led to some tunnelling companies starting work later than others. The number of units available to the BEF was also restricted by the need to provide effective counter-measures to the German mining activities. To make the tunnels safer and quicker to deploy, the British Army enlisted experienced coal miners, many outside their nominal recruitment policy. The first nine companies, numbers 170 to 178, were each commanded by a regular Royal Engineers officer. These companies each comprised 5 officers and 269 sappers; they were aided by additional infantrymen who were temporarily attached to the tunnellers as required, which almost doubled their numbers. The success of the first tunnelling companies formed under Norton-Griffiths' command led to mining being made a separate branch of the Engineer-in-Chief's office under Major-General S.R. Rice, and the appointment of an 'Inspector of Mines' at the GHQ Saint-Omer office of the Engineer-in-Chief. A second group of tunnelling companies were formed from Welsh miners from the 1st and 3rd Battalions of the Monmouthshire Regiment, who were attached to the 1st Northumberland Field Company of the Royal Engineers, which was a Territorial unit. The formation of twelve new tunnelling companies, between July and October 1915, helped to bring more men into action in other parts of the Western Front.

Most tunnelling companies were formed under Norton-Griffiths' leadership during 1915, and one more was added in 1916. On 10 September 1915, the British government sent an appeal to Canada, South Africa, Australia and New Zealand to raise tunnelling companies in the Dominions of the British Empire. On 17 September, New Zealand became the first Dominion to agree to the formation of a tunnelling unit. The New Zealand Tunnelling Company arrived at Plymouth on 3 February 1916 and was deployed to the Western Front in northern France. A Canadian unit was formed from men on the battlefield, plus two other companies trained in Canada and then shipped to France. Three Australian tunnelling companies were formed by March 1916, resulting in 30 tunnelling companies of the Royal Engineers being available by the summer of 1916.

== Unit history ==
=== The Somme 1915/16 ===
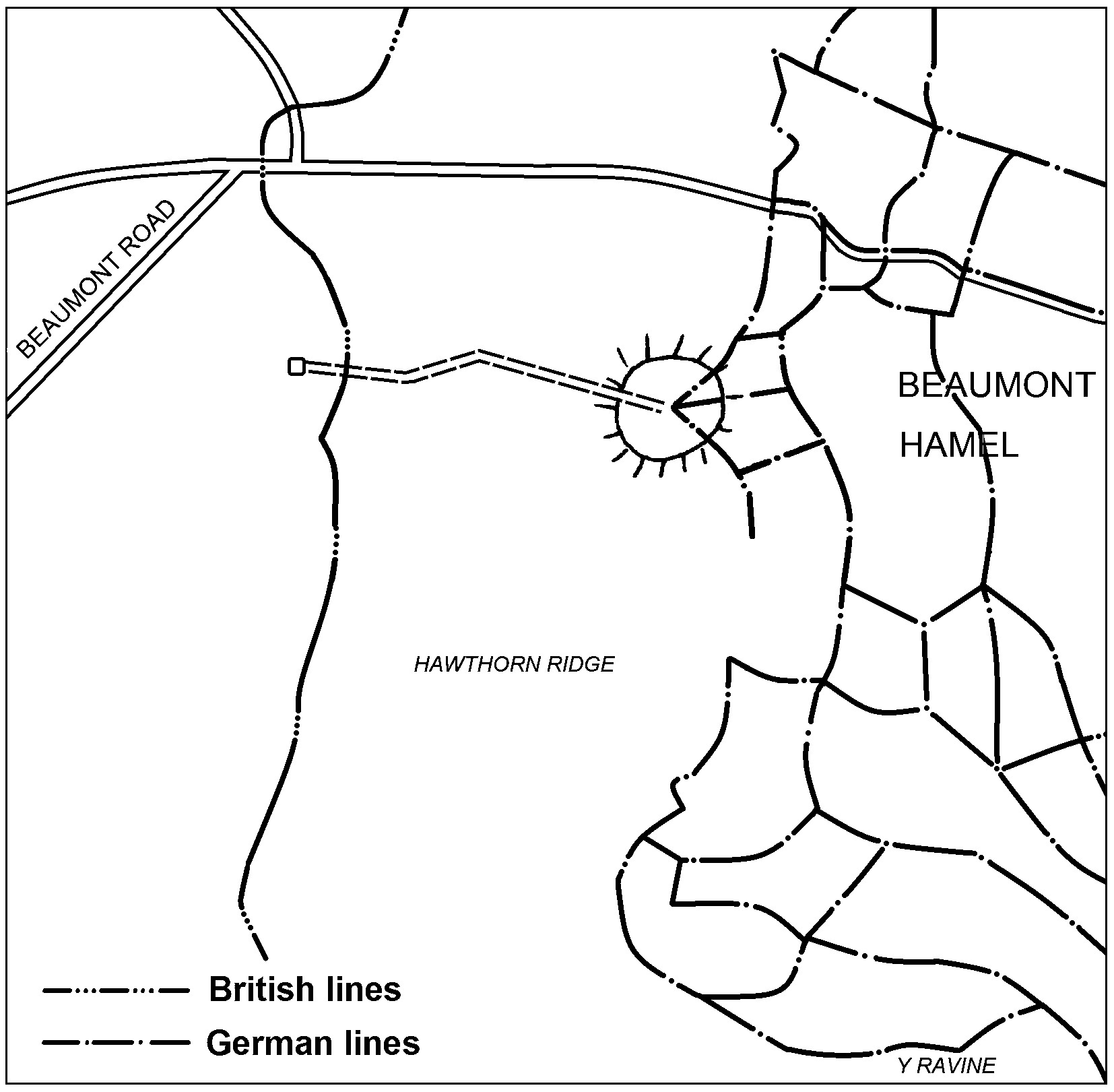
Plan of the H3 mine placed beneath the Hawthorn Ridge Redoubt

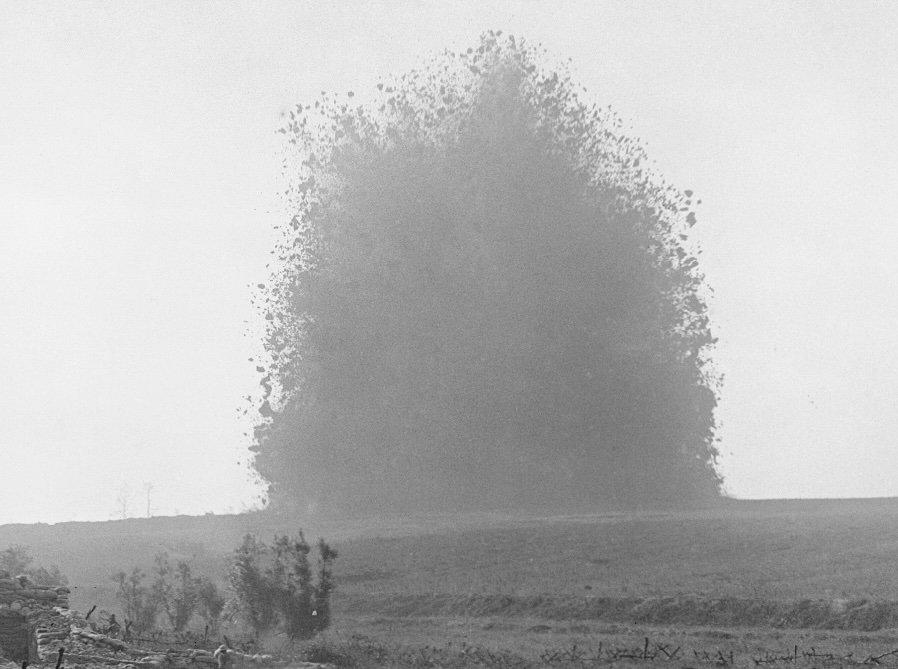
The explosion of the H3 mine under Hawthorn Ridge Redoubt I, 1 July 1916 (Photo by Ernest Brooks)

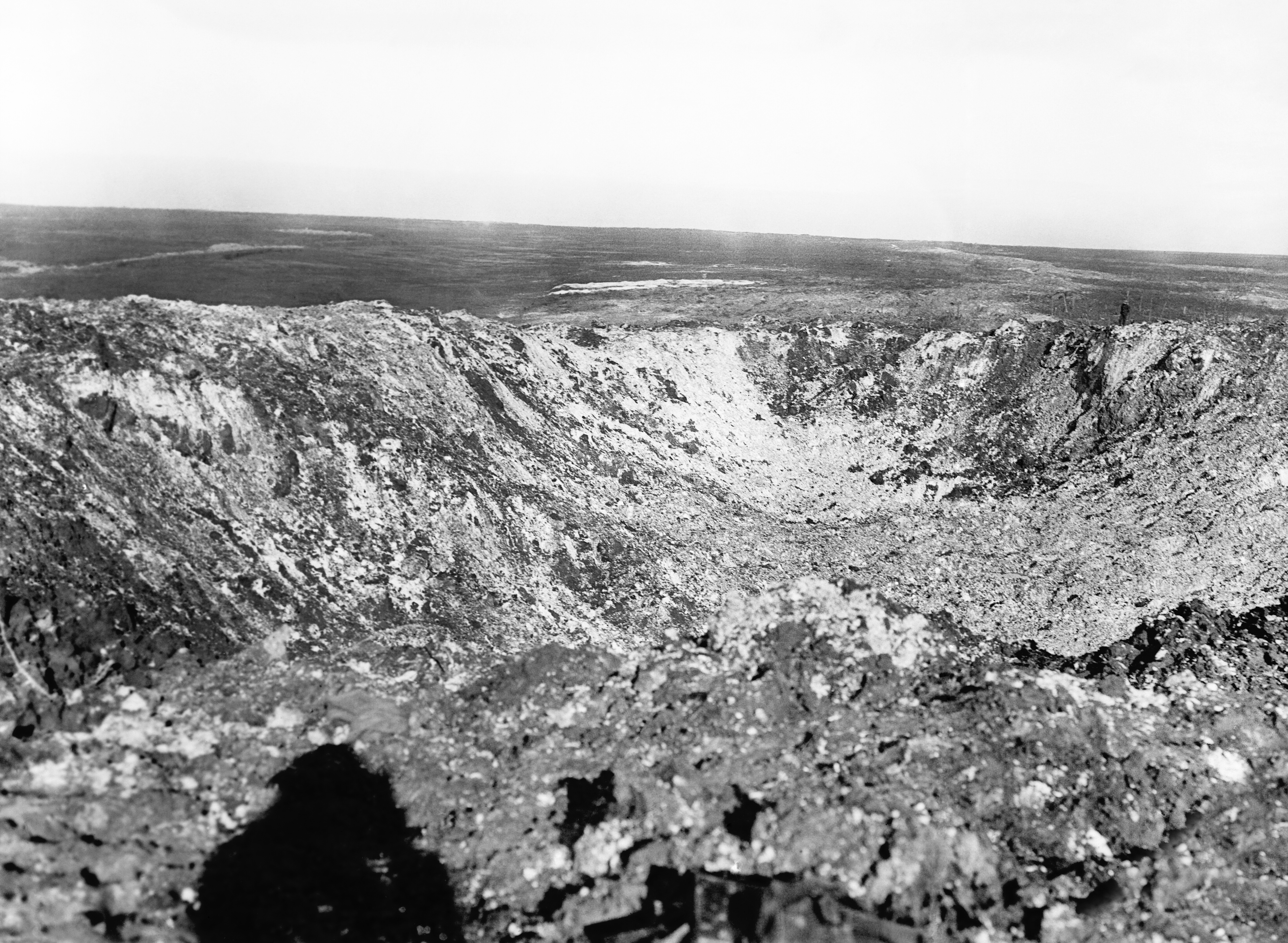
The crater left by the mine fired beneath Hawthorn Ridge Redoubt (IWM Q 1527, November 1916); note shadow of photographer, left foreground

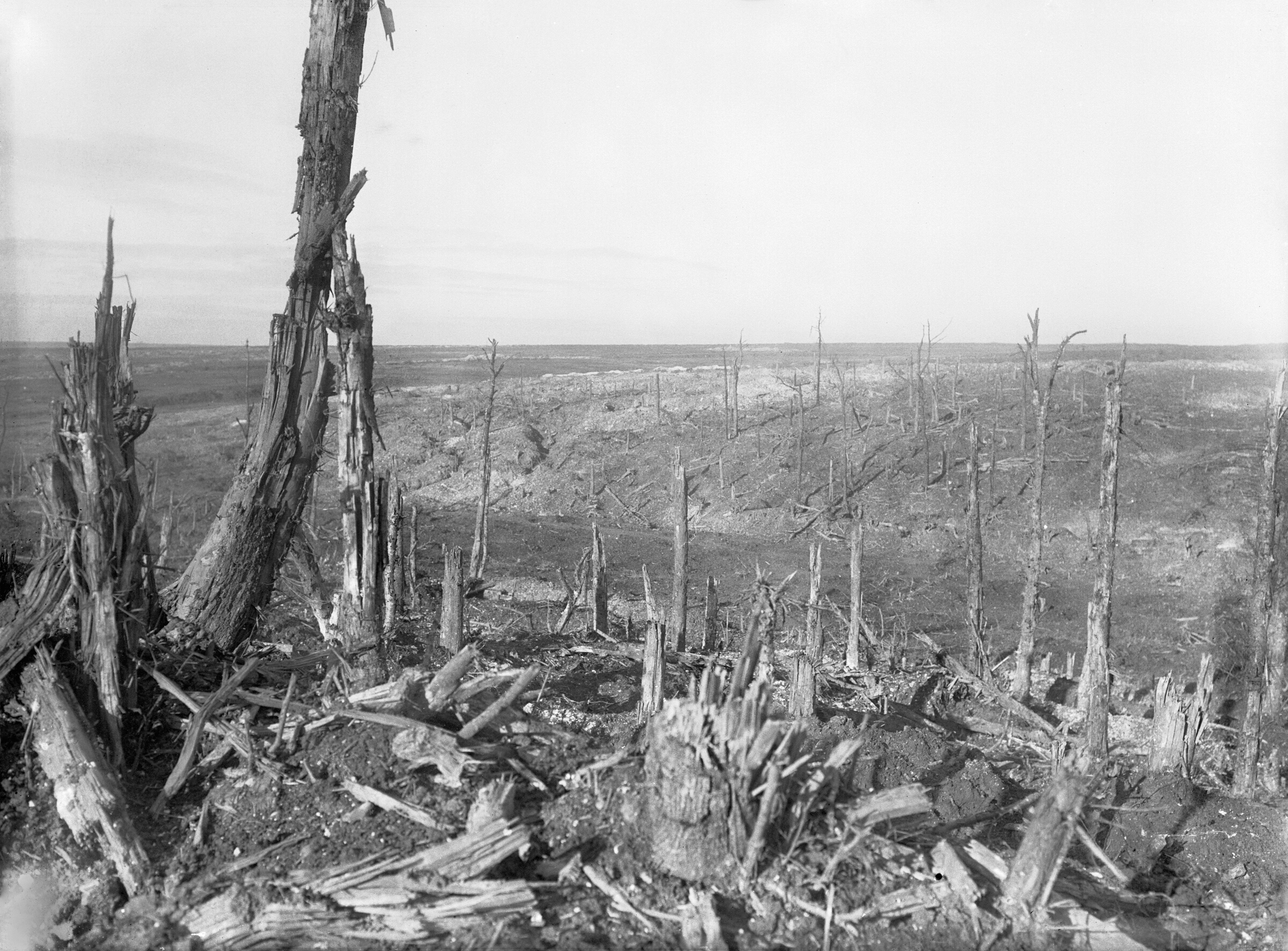
The fields around Beaumont-Hamel after the Battle of the Somme.

In the Somme sector of the Western Front, local but very fierce underground fighting had taken place in the winter of 1914 and spring of 1915 at La Boisselle, Fricourt, Bois Français and Carnoy. Fowke moved the 174th and 183rd Tunnelling Companies there to relieve the French engineers, but the British did not have enough miners to take over the large number of French shafts and the French agreed to leave their engineers at work for several weeks. To provide the tunnellers needed, the British formed the 178th and 179th Tunnelling Companies in August 1915, followed by the 185th and 252nd Tunnelling Companies in October. The 181st Tunnelling Company was also present on the Somme. The tunnelling companies were to make two major contributions to the Allied preparations for the Battle of the Somme (1 July – 18 November 1916) by placing 19 large and small mines beneath the German positions along the front line and by preparing a series of shallow Russian saps from the British front line into no man's land, which would be opened at zero hour and allow the infantry to attack the German positions from a comparatively short distance.

From October 1915 until April 1919 252nd Tunnelling Company served under Third Army. After its formation, the company was employed in the Hebuterne-Beaumont-Hamel sector of the battlefield, where it helped prepare the opening of the battle on 1 July 1916 and continued operations throughout the fight. In the north of the battlefield, the unit dug a large mine, code named H3, at Hawthorn Ridge Redoubt and prepared twelve Russian saps facing Serre. Digging the saps required a large force of labour, and by April 1916 the unit had 1,900 infantry attached. Near the Hawthorn Ridge Redoubt at Beaumont-Hamel, 252nd Tunnelling Company excavated three tunnels under no man's land: The first was a 2-by-5-foot (0.61 m × 1.52 m) tunnel dug overnight to link to the now famous Sunken Lane (shown in the film The Battle of the Somme, released in August 1916) with the old British front line, and through which British units moved into position before the attack. In the early hours of 1 July, the 1st Battalion Lancashire Fusiliers would use this tunnel to move up into the "Sunken Lane", the starting position for their attack on Beaumont-Hamel. The two other tunnels were Russian saps, dug to within 30 yards (27 m) of the German front line, ready to be opened at 2:00 a.m. on 1 July, as emplacements for batteries of Stokes mortars. They were called First Avenue and Mary, named after the communications trenches leading into them.

The large H3 mine, located north of First Avenue and Mary, was placed by 252nd Tunnelling Company beneath Hawthorn Ridge Redoubt, the German stronghold on the ridge. Work on H3 began in spring 1916. The tunnellers under the command of Captain Rex Trower dug a gallery for about 1,000 yards (910 m) from the British lines about 57 feet (17 m) underground beneath the German position on the crest of the ridge. By the end of May, the mine gallery had been driven 900 feet (270 m), despite considerable trouble caused by the hard chalk and the number of flints in the face. To preserve silence, the face was softened by the application of water. In June the gallery was finished and charged with 40,000 pounds (18,000 kg) of Ammonal.

The VIII Corps commander, Lieutenant-General Aylmer Hunter-Weston, wanted the Hawthorn Ridge mine to be sprung four hours before zero hour, so that the crater could be captured and consolidated and the alarm on the German side would have died down. (Note: The plan was quashed at British Expeditionary Force General Headquarters (GHQ) after the Inspector of Mines pointed out that the British had never managed to reach a mine crater before the Germans and that the mine should be detonated at zero hour.) On 15 June 1916, the Fourth Army headquarters ruled that all mines on 1 July should be blown no earlier than eight minutes before zero but an unsatisfactory compromise was reached with Hunter-Weston to blow the Hawthorn Ridge mine ten minutes before zero hour.

A witness to the detonation of the Hawthorn Ridge mine was British cinematographer Geoffrey Malins who was filming the 29th Division attack. He had his camera set up about 0.5-mile (0.80 km) away, trained on the ridge and waiting for the explosion at 7:20 a.m.:

The ground where I stood gave a mighty convulsion. It rocked and swayed. I gripped hold of my tripod to steady myself. Then for all the world like a gigantic sponge, the earth rose high in the air to the height of hundreds of feet. Higher and higher it rose, and with a horrible grinding roar the earth settles back upon itself, leaving in its place a mountain of smoke.

— Geoffrey Malins

The mine completely destroyed the Hawthorn Redoubt, garrisoned by the Reserve Infantry Regiment 119. The unit's regimental recorded that

... there was a terrific explosion which for the moment completely drowned out the thunder of the artillery. A great cloud of smoke rose up from the trenches of No 9 Company, followed by a tremendous shower of stones.... The ground all round was white with the débris of chalk as if it had been snowing and a gigantic crater, over fifty yards in diameter and some sixty feet deep gaped like an open wound in the side of the hill.

— Reserve Infantry Regiment 119 historian

Many Germans were entombed in a large dugout, all four entrances of which were blocked, but they were rescued later in the day. Others were crushed or blown to pieces. Despite the shock and disorientation caused by the detonation of the mine, German troops immediately occupied the rear of lip of the crater. The Germans also immediately brought down a heavy artillery barrage onto the British trenches. The 2nd Royal Fusiliers, crossing no man's land to occupy the crater, came under heavy German rifle and machine-gun fire from either flank and the rear lip. A few of 2nd Royal Fusiliers managed to reach the closest lip of the crater and held on until noon when they were forced out by a German counter-attack. The failure to take the Redoubt had a serious effect on the VIII Corps' operations north of the River Ancre.

After the detonation of the H3 mine at Hawthorn Ridge Redoubt on 1 July, 252nd Tunnelling Company on 4 July began work on a second mine, loaded with 14,000 kilograms (30,000 lb) of ammonal, which was placed beneath the crater of the first explosion. This new mine was fired to signal Zero Hour at the start of the Battle of the Ancre on 13 November 1916, when a successful British attack took the village of Beaumont-Hamel. The crater visible on Hawthorn Ridge is therefore actually a double crater, lined today with trees and thick undergrowth, but not filled with water. The site affords good views of the location of the German positions.

=== Vimy Ridge 1918 ===
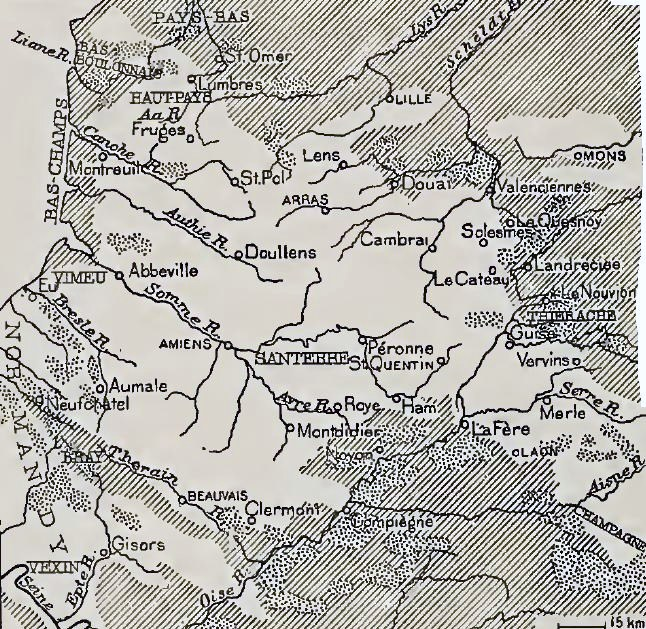
Map of chalk areas in northern France

In early 1918 half of 252nd Tunnelling Company, arriving from Beaumont-Hamel, was attached to 172nd Tunnelling Company at Vimy.

Vimy was an area of busy underground activity for much of the war. Between October 1915 and April 1917 an estimated 150 French, British and German charges were fired in the 7 kilometres (4.3 mi)-long Vimy sector of the Western Front. The British gallery network beneath Vimy Ridge eventually grew to a length of 12 kilometres (7.5 mi). Other units active around Vimy, particularly in preparation for the Battle of Vimy Ridge (9-12 April 1917) were 172nd, 175th, 176th, 182nd and 185th Tunnelling Companies.

=== Spring Offensive 1918 ===
In the German attack of March 1918, the 252nd Tunnelling Company was engaged in defensive mining operations and facing the attack near Boursies.

Once the front had stabilised after the German offensive, British engineers began digging stronger defences. 252nd Tunnelling Company instructed the field companies of 42nd (East Lancashire) Divisional Engineers in digging deep dugouts. In August the Allied Hundred Days Offensive began. During the pursuit after the Second Battle of Bapaume, 42nd (EL) Divisional RE had one field company on front-line work, with Captain Dean's section of 252nd Tunnelling Co attached to search dugouts and roads for booby-traps and mines, clear broken bridges wit explosives, and it also reconnoitred village wells that had been damaged by the retreating Germans.

== See also ==
- Mine warfare
