= 178th Tunnelling Company =

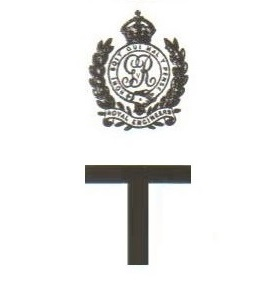
- Active: World War I
- Country: United Kingdom
- Branch: British Army
- Type: Royal Engineer tunnelling company
- Role: military engineering, tunnel warfare
- Nickname: "The Moles"
- Engagements: World War I Battle of the Somme; German spring offensive

The 178th Tunnelling Company was one of the tunnelling companies of the Royal Engineers created by the British Army during World War I. The tunnelling units were occupied in offensive and defensive mining involving the placing and maintaining of mines under enemy lines, as well as other underground work such as the construction of deep dugouts for troop accommodation, the digging of subways, saps (a narrow trench dug to approach enemy trenches), cable trenches and underground chambers for signals and medical services.

== Background ==
By January 1915 it had become evident to the BEF at the Western Front that the Germans were mining to a planned system. As the British had failed to develop suitable counter-tactics or underground listening devices before the war, field marshals French and Kitchener agreed to investigate the suitability of forming British mining units. Following consultations between the Engineer-in-Chief of the BEF, Brigadier George Fowke, and the mining specialist John Norton-Griffiths, the War Office formally approved the tunnelling company scheme on 19 February 1915.

Norton-Griffiths ensured that tunnelling companies numbers 170 to 177 were ready for deployment in mid-February 1915. In the spring of that year, there was constant underground fighting in the Ypres Salient at Hooge, Hill 60, Railway Wood, Sanctuary Wood, St Eloi and The Bluff which required the deployment of new drafts of tunnellers for several months after the formation of the first eight companies. The lack of suitably experienced men led to some tunnelling companies starting work later than others. The number of units available to the BEF was also restricted by the need to provide effective counter-measures to the German mining activities. To make the tunnels safer and quicker to deploy, the British Army enlisted experienced coal miners, many outside their nominal recruitment policy. The first nine companies, numbers 170 to 178, were each commanded by a regular Royal Engineers officer. These companies each comprised 5 officers and 269 sappers; they were aided by additional infantrymen who were temporarily attached to the tunnellers as required, which almost doubled their numbers. The success of the first tunnelling companies formed under Norton-Griffiths' command led to mining being made a separate branch of the Engineer-in-Chief's office under Major-General S.R. Rice, and the appointment of an 'Inspector of Mines' at the GHQ Saint-Omer office of the Engineer-in-Chief. A second group of tunnelling companies were formed from Welsh miners from the 1st and 3rd Battalions of the Monmouthshire Regiment, who were attached to the 1st Northumberland Field Company of the Royal Engineers, which was a Territorial unit. The formation of twelve new tunnelling companies, between July and October 1915, helped to bring more men into action in other parts of the Western Front.

Most tunnelling companies were formed under Norton-Griffiths' leadership during 1915, and one more was added in 1916. On 10 September 1915, the British government sent an appeal to Canada, South Africa, Australia and New Zealand to raise tunnelling companies in the Dominions of the British Empire. On 17 September, New Zealand became the first Dominion to agree the formation of a tunnelling unit. The New Zealand Tunnelling Company arrived at Plymouth on 3 February 1916 and was deployed to the Western Front in northern France. A Canadian unit was formed from men on the battlefield, plus two other companies trained in Canada and then shipped to France. Three Australian tunnelling companies were formed by March 1916, resulting in 30 tunnelling companies of the Royal Engineers being available by the summer of 1916.

== Unit history ==
=== Battle of the Somme ===
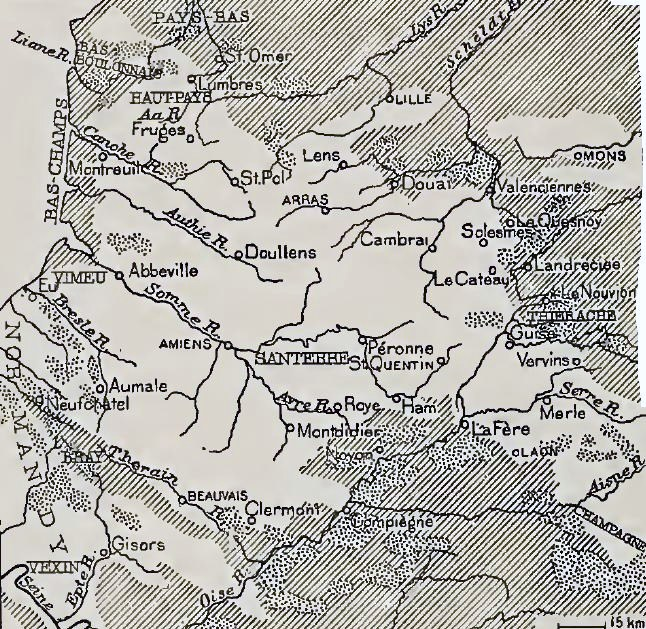
Map of chalk areas in northern France

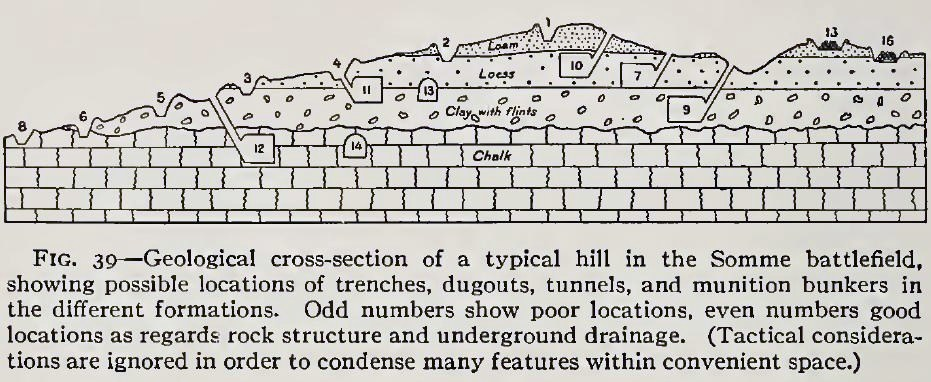
Geological cross-section of the Somme battlefield

From its formation until after the end of the war 178th Tunnelling Company served under Third Army. After formation, the company moved to the Fricourt sector of the Somme. In the Somme sector of the Western Front, local but very fierce underground fighting had taken place in the winter of 1914 and spring of 1915 at La Boisselle, Fricourt, Bois Français and Carnoy. Fowke moved the 174th and 183rd Tunnelling Companies there to relieve the French engineers, but the British did not have enough miners to take over the large number of French shafts and the French agreed to leave their engineers at work for several weeks. To provide the tunnellers needed, the British formed the 178th and 179th Tunnelling Companies in August 1915, followed by the 185th and 252nd Tunnelling Companies in October. The 181st Tunnelling Company was also present on the Somme.

178th Tunnelling Company's war diary records a high mortality rate while engaged on the Somme. In the last five months of 1915, more than 300 men of the unit died. In May 1916, the 178th Tunnelling Company was billeted in the village of Méaulte and mining in the Fricourt sector. The war diary for 1 May records heavy damage to the British trenches and mine heads by German bombardment on 30 April. On 6 May, orders and instructions had to be issued regarding the frequent task of rescuing gassed and entombed miners in the sector. On 1 June, eight men of the 178th Tunnelling Company were killed in a German mine blow and the war diary entry for 2 June reads, "Work of rescuing entombed miners proceeding with difficulty. Only one still alive." In the month of June 1916, 101 mines were fired by the British along the frontline in a single month.

As part of the Allied preparations for the Battle of the Somme (1 July – 18 November 1916), the tunnelling companies were to make two major contributions by placing 19 large and small mines beneath the German positions along the front line and by preparing a series of shallow Russian saps from the British front line into no man's land, which would be opened at zero hour and allow the infantry to attack the German positions from a comparatively short distance.

In the British front sector allocated to XV Corps, the tunnellers of 178th Tunnelling Company placed a group of mines known as Triple Tambour beneath the German Kniewerk stronghold (see map). The Tambour was a very active mining area, German trench maps indicating five craters before 1 July 1916. The craters resulting from the explosion of the three charges on the first day of the battle were intended to protect the advancing British infantry from German enfilade fire from the village of Fricourt. It was thought the mines could raise a protective "lip" of earth that would obscure the view from the village but the actual benefit was minimal. The Triple Tambour mines were loaded with relatively small charges of 4,100 kilograms (9,000 lb), 6,800 kilograms (15,000 lb) and 11,000 kilograms (25,000 lb) which were detonated just before the infantry advanced; one failed to explode due to damp and still lies buried off Fricourt. 178th Tunnelling Company's war diary entry reads "1/7/16 “Z”Day. Mines in G3E, G19A exploded at 7:28 a.m. 2 minutes before Zero. G15b not successful". The site of these mines (photo) now appears as a small area of cratered ground in the field beyond the Commonwealth War Graves Commission's Fricourt New Military Cemetery. The land they are on is private property.

After its work at Fricourt, 178th Tunnelling Company moved up to try to mine enemy positions in High Wood, as the advance progressed in July 1916. In late summer of 1916, the unit drove a mine at High Wood at just 7.6 metres (25 ft) depth, 98 metres (320 ft) long, which they charged with 1,400 kilograms (3,000 lb) of ammonal. It was blown thirty seconds before Zero Hour on 3 September 1916. After advancing British infantry had failed to capture the crater permanently, 178th Tunnelling Company reopened the gallery, charged it with another 1,400 kilograms (3,000 lb) of ammonal and blew the mine again on 9 September. This time the crater was successfully held.

=== Spring Offensive ===
In March 1918, the 178th Tunnelling Company was spread in Fins, Gouzeaucourt and Heudicourt when the German bombardment struck these places during the Spring Offensive. After this, the company was engaged in bridge demolition at the Tortille river, and other defensive activities.

== See also ==
- Mine warfare

== Bibliography ==
- Jones, Simon (2010). Underground Warfare 1914-1918. Pen & Sword Military. ISBN 978-1-84415-962-8.
