= 179th Tunnelling Company =

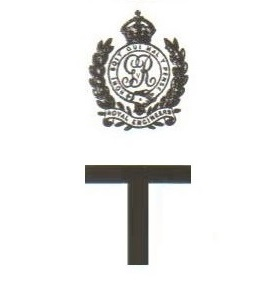
- Active: World War I
- Country: United Kingdom
- Branch: British Army
- Type: Royal Engineer tunnelling company
- Role: Military engineering, tunnel warfare
- Nickname: "The Moles"
- Engagements: World War I Battle of the Somme

Commanders
- Notable commanders: Henry Hance

The 179th Tunnelling Company was one of the tunnelling companies of the Royal Engineers created by the British Army during World War I. The tunnelling units were occupied in offensive and defensive mining involving the placing and maintaining of mines under enemy lines, as well as other underground work such as the construction of deep dugouts for troop accommodation, the digging of subways, saps (a narrow trench dug to approach enemy trenches), cable trenches and underground chambers for signals and medical services. 179th Tunnelling Company is particularly known for its role at L'îlot de La Boisselle and for firing the Lochnagar mine during the Battle of the Somme 1916. The Lochnagar mine formed part of a series of 19 mines that were placed beneath the German lines on the British section of the Somme front to assist the start of the battle.

== Background ==
By January 1915 it had become evident to the BEF at the Western Front that the Germans were mining to a planned system. As the British had failed to develop suitable counter-tactics or underground listening devices before the war, field marshals French and Kitchener agreed to investigate the suitability of forming British mining units. Following consultations between the Engineer-in-Chief of the BEF, Brigadier George Fowke, and the mining specialist John Norton-Griffiths, the War Office formally approved the tunnelling company scheme on 19 February 1915.

Norton-Griffiths ensured that tunnelling companies numbers 170 to 177 were ready for deployment in mid-February 1915. In the spring of that year, there was constant underground fighting in the Ypres Salient at Hooge, Hill 60, Railway Wood, Sanctuary Wood, St Eloi and The Bluff which required the deployment of new drafts of tunnellers for several months after the formation of the first eight companies. The lack of suitably experienced men led to some tunnelling companies starting work later than others. The number of units available to the BEF was also restricted by the need to provide effective counter-measures to the German mining activities. To make the tunnels safer and quicker to deploy, the British Army enlisted experienced coal miners, many outside their nominal recruitment policy. The first nine companies, numbers 170 to 178, were each commanded by a regular Royal Engineers officer. These companies each comprised 5 officers and 269 sappers; they were aided by additional infantrymen who were temporarily attached to the tunnellers as required, which almost doubled their numbers. The success of the first tunnelling companies formed under Norton-Griffiths' command led to mining being made a separate branch of the Engineer-in-Chief's office under Major-General S.R. Rice, and the appointment of an 'Inspector of Mines' at the GHQ Saint-Omer office of the Engineer-in-Chief. A second group of tunnelling companies were formed from Welsh miners from the 1st and 3rd Battalions of the Monmouthshire Regiment, who were attached to the 1st Northumberland Field Company of the Royal Engineers, which was a Territorial unit. The formation of twelve new tunnelling companies, between July and October 1915, helped to bring more men into action in other parts of the Western Front.

Most tunnelling companies were formed under Norton-Griffiths' leadership during 1915, and one more was added in 1916. On 10 September 1915, the British government sent an appeal to Canada, South Africa, Australia and New Zealand to raise tunnelling companies in the Dominions of the British Empire. On 17 September, New Zealand became the first Dominion to agree the formation of a tunnelling unit. The New Zealand Tunnelling Company arrived at Plymouth on 3 February 1916 and was deployed to the Western Front in northern France. A Canadian unit was formed from men on the battlefield, plus two other companies trained in Canada and then shipped to France. Three Australian tunnelling companies were formed by March 1916, resulting in 30 tunnelling companies of the Royal Engineers being available by the summer of 1916.

== Unit history ==
=== The Somme 1915/16 ===
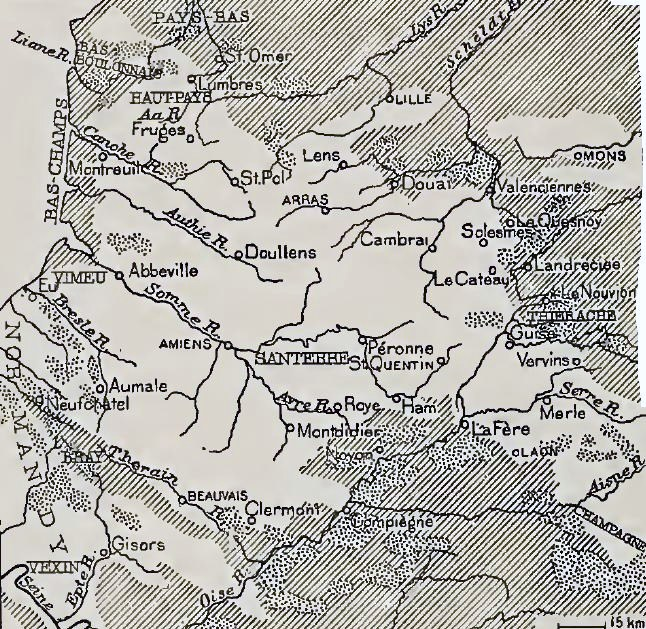
Map of chalk areas in northern France

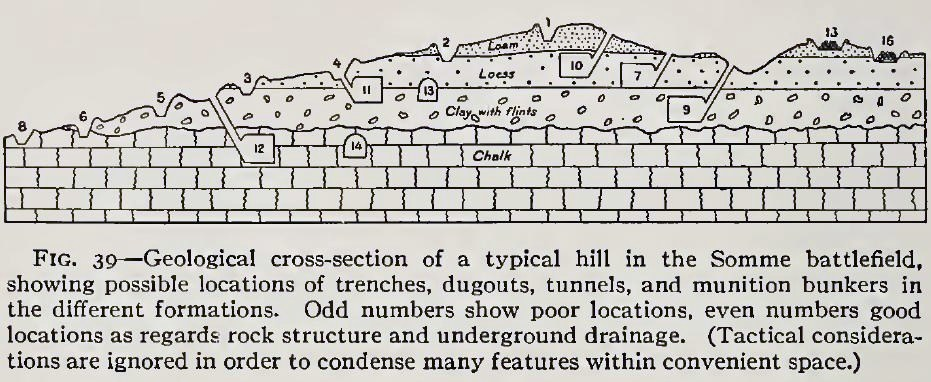
Geological cross-section of the Somme battlefield

The 179th Tunnelling Company was formed in Third Army area in October 1915 and moved into the Thiepval-La Boisselle sector of the area of the Somme recently taken over by the BEF. In the Somme sector of the Western Front, local but very fierce underground fighting had taken place in the winter of 1914 and spring of 1915 at La Boisselle, Fricourt, Bois Français and Carnoy. Fowke moved the 174th and 183rd Tunnelling Companies there to relieve the French engineers, but the British did not have enough miners to take over the large number of French shafts and the French agreed to leave their engineers at work for several weeks. To provide the tunnellers needed, the British formed the 178th and 179th Tunnelling Companies in August 1915, followed by the 185th and 252nd Tunnelling Companies in October. The 181st Tunnelling Company was also present on the Somme. Early attempts at mining by the British on the Western Front had commenced in late 1914 in the soft clay and sandy soils of Flanders. Mining at La Boisselle was in chalk, much harder and requiring different techniques. The German advance had been halted at La Boisselle by French troops on 28 September 1914. There was bitter fighting for possession of the village cemetery, and for farm buildings on the south-western edge of the village known as L'îlot de La Boisselle to the French, as Granathof (German: "shell farm") to the Germans and later as Glory Hole to the British. In December 1914, French engineers had begun tunnelling beneath the ruins. With the war on the surface at stalemate, both sides continued to probe beneath the opponent's trenches and detonate ever-greater explosive charges. In August 1915, the French and Germans were working at a depth of 12 metres (39 ft); the size of their charges had reached 3,000 kilograms (6,600 lb). The British tunnelling companies extended and deepened the system, first to 24 metres (79 ft) and ultimately 30 metres (98 ft). Around La Boisselle, the Germans also dug defensive transversal tunnels at a depth of about 80 feet (24 metres), parallel to the front line. No man's land at L'îlot was very narrow, at one point about 46 metres (50 yd) wide, and had become pockmarked by many chalk craters.

In October 1915, the 179th Tunnelling Company began to sink a series of deep shafts in an attempt to forestall German miners who were approaching beneath the British front line. At W Shaft they went down from 9.1 metres (30 ft) to 24 metres (80 ft) and began to drive two counter-mine tunnels towards the Germans. From the right-hand gallery the sounds of German digging grew steadily louder. On 19 November 1915, 179th Tunnelling Company's commander, Captain Henry Hance, estimated that the Germans were 15 yards away and ordered the mine chamber to be loaded with 2,700 kilograms (6,000 lb) of explosive. This was completed by midnight from 20 to 21 November. At 1.30 am on 22 November, the Germans blew their charge, filling the remaining British tunnels with carbon monoxide. Both the right and left tunnels were collapsed, and it was later found that the German blow had detonated the British charge. The wrecked tunnels were gradually re-opened, but about thirty bodies still lie in the tunnels beneath La Boisselle.

At the start of the Battle of Albert (1–13 July), the name given by the British to the first two weeks of the Battle of the Somme, La Boisselle stood on the main axis of British attack. The tunnelling companies were to make two major contributions to the Allied preparations by placing 19 large and small mines beneath the German positions along the front line and by preparing a series of shallow Russian saps from the British front line into no man's land, which would be opened at zero hour and allow the infantry to attack the German positions from a comparatively short distance.

Russian saps in front of Thiepval, Ovillers and La Boisselle were the task of 179th Tunnelling Company. In the front section allocated to the 36th (Ulster) Division, ten saps were run from the British lines into no-man's land north-east of Thiepval Wood. The intention was for each of the ten tunnels to house two mortars.

At La Boisselle, four mines were prepared by the Royal Engineers: Two charges (known as No 2 straight and No 5 right) were planted at L'îlot at the end of galleries dug from Inch Street Trench by the 179th Tunnelling Company, intended to wreck German tunnels and create crater lips to block enfilade fire along no man's land. As the Germans in La Boisselle had fortified the cellars of ruined houses, and cratered ground made a direct infantry assault on the village impossible, two further mines, known as Y Sap and Lochnagar after the trenches from which they were dug, were laid on the north-east and the south-east of La Boisselle to assist the attack on either side of the German salient in the village – see map.

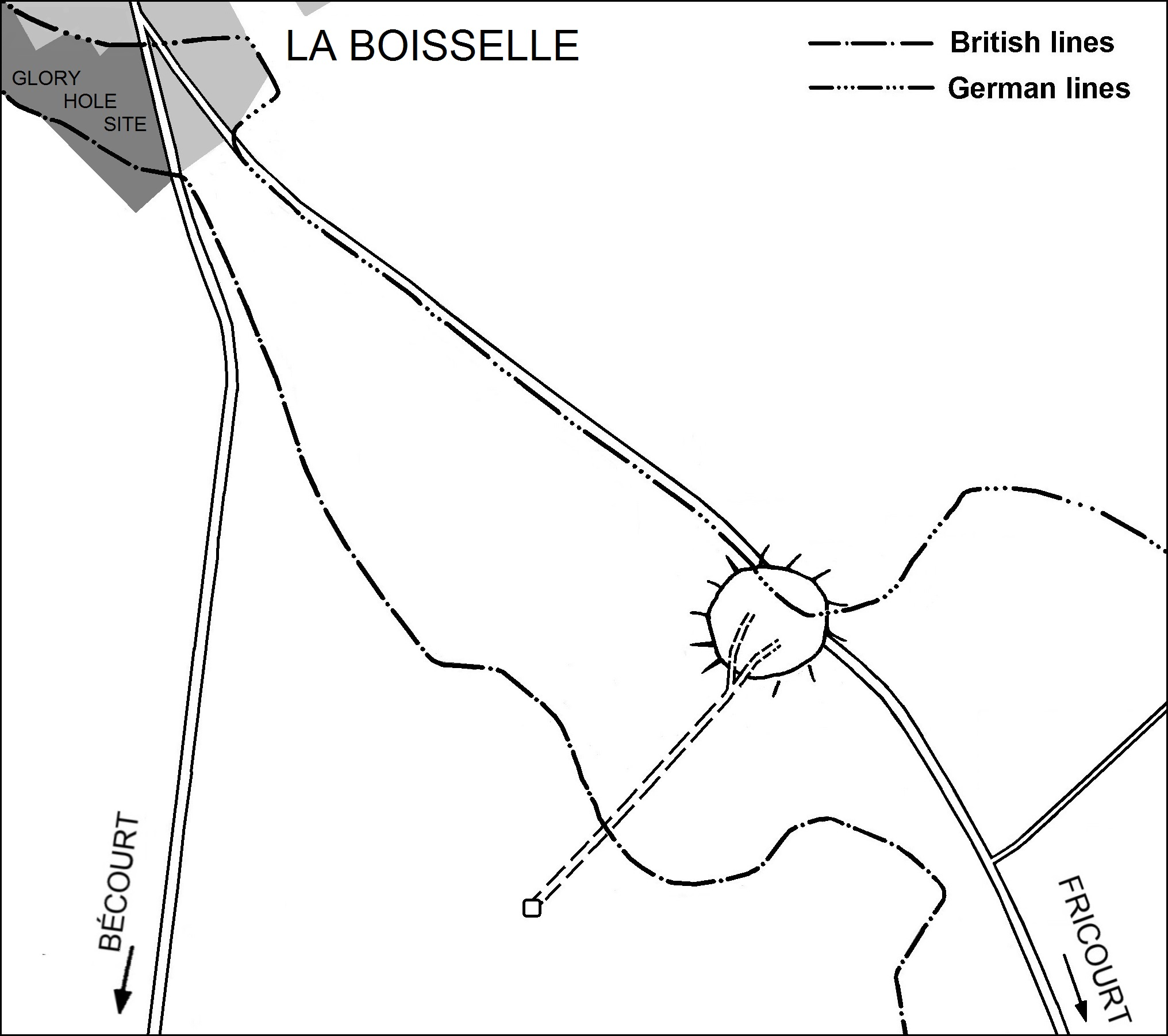
Plan of the Lochnagar mine; for an aerial view of the site with marked front lines, see here

The 185th Tunnelling Company started work on the Lochnagar mine on 11 November 1915 and handed the tunnels over to 179th Tunnelling Company in March 1916. A month before the handover, 18 men of the 185th Tunnelling Company (2 officers, 16 sappers) were killed on 4 February when the Germans detonated a camouflet near the British three-level mine system, starting from Inch Street, La Boisselle, the deepest level being just above the water table at around 30 metres (100 ft). The Lochnagar mine consisted of two chambers with a shared access tunnel (see map). The shaft was sunk in the communication trench called "Lochnagar Street". After the Black Watch had arrived at La Boissselle at the end of July 1915, many existing Allied fortifications, originally dug by the French, had been given Scotland-related names. The Lochnagar mine probably had the first deep incline shaft, which sloped 1:2–1:3 to a depth of about 29 metres (95 ft) – see map. It was begun 91 metres (300 ft) behind the British front line and 270 metres (900 ft) away from the German front line. Starting from the inclined shaft, about 15 metres (50 ft) below ground, a gallery was driven towards the German lines. For silence, the tunnellers used bayonets with spliced handles and worked barefoot on a floor covered with sandbags. Flints were carefully prised out of the chalk and laid on the floor; if the bayonet was manipulated two-handed, an assistant caught the dislodged material. Spoil was placed in sandbags and passed hand-by-hand, along a row of miners sitting on the floor and stored along the side of the tunnel, later to be used to tamp the charge. When about 41 metres (135 ft) from the Schwabenhöhe, the tunnel was forked into two branches and the end of each branch was enlarged to form a chamber for the explosives, the chambers being about 18 metres (60 ft) apart and 16 metres (52 ft) deep – see map. When finished, the access tunnel for the Lochnagar mine was 1.37 by 0.76 metres (4.5 ft × 2.5 ft) and had been excavated at a rate of about 46 centimetres (18 in) per day, until about 310 metres (1,030 ft) long, with the galleries beneath the Schwabenhöhe. The mine was loaded with 27,000 kilograms (60,000 lb) of ammonal, divided in two charges of 16,000 kilograms (36,000 lb) and 11,000 kilograms (24,000 lb). As the chambers were not big enough to hold all the explosive, the tunnels that branched to form the 'Y' were also filled with ammonal. The longer branch was 18 metres (60 ft) long, the shorter was 12 metres (40 ft) long. The tunnels did not quite reach the German front line but the blast would dislodge enough material to form a 4.6 metres (15 ft) high rim and bury nearby trenches.

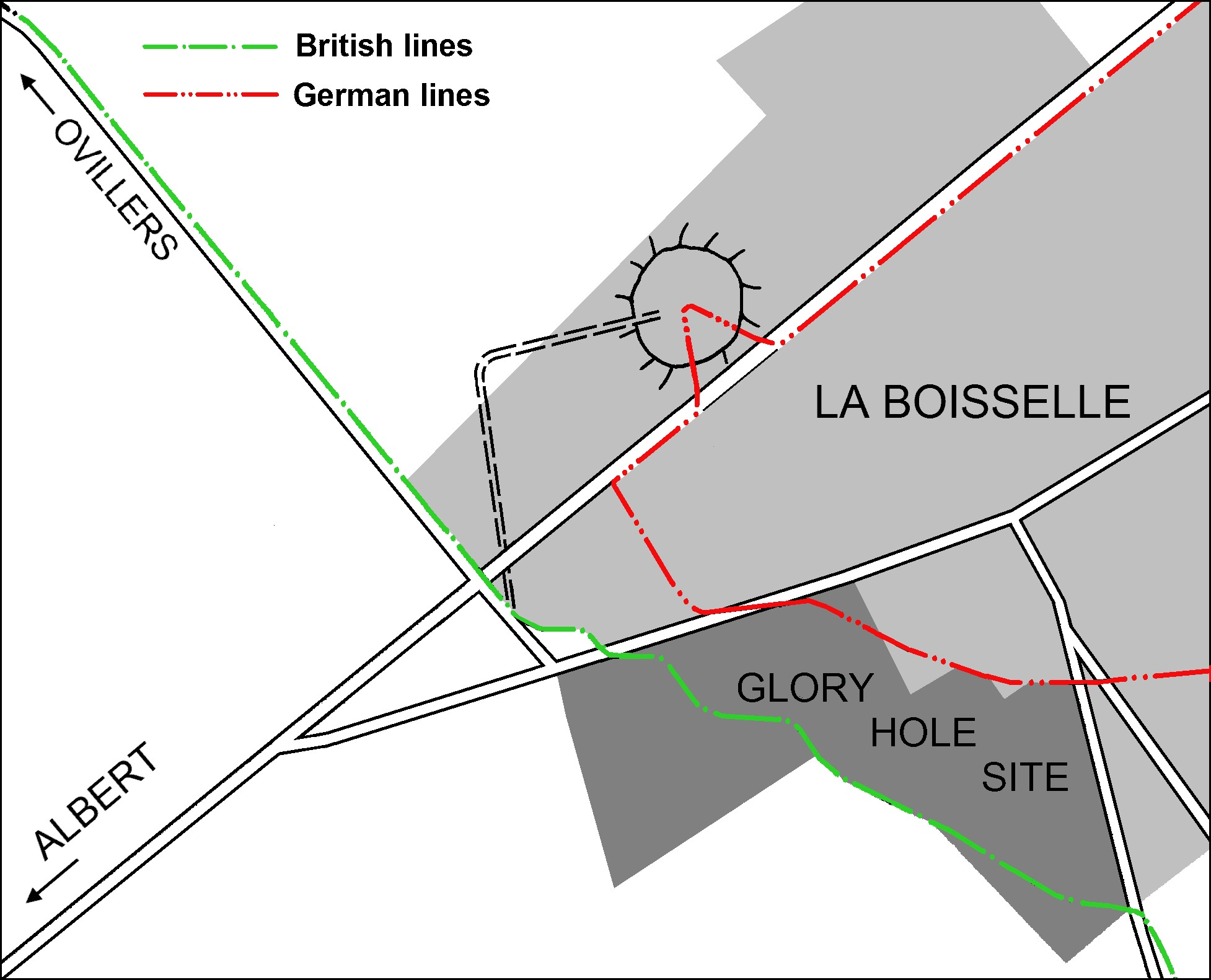
Plan of the Y Sap mine. The Glory Hole site was known as Granathof to the Germans and as L'îlot de La Boisselle to the French.

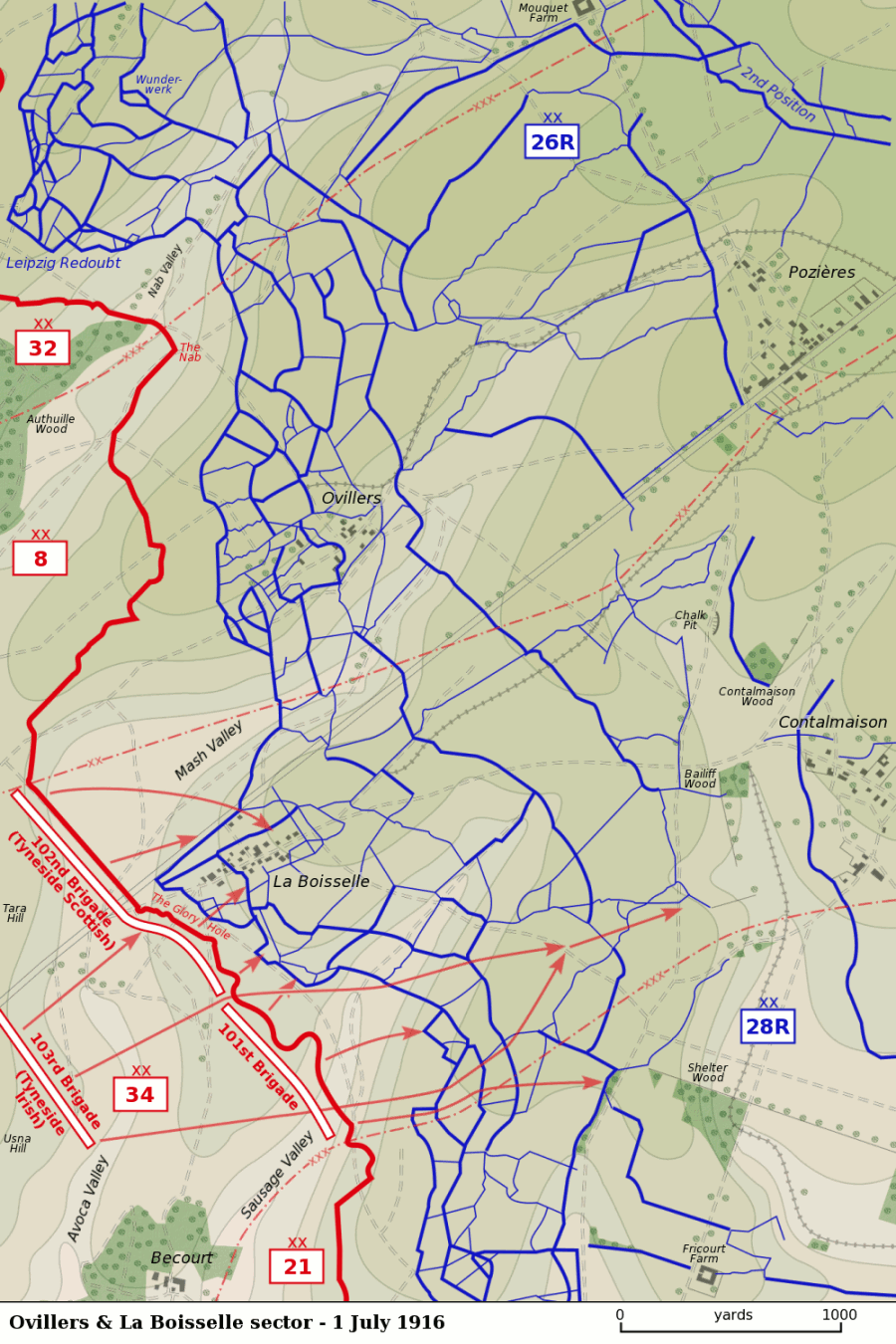
34th Division attack at La Boisselle, 1 July 1916

The tunnel for the Y Sap mine underneath the German trenches overlooking Mash Valley just north of La Boisselle started in the British front line near where it crossed the D 929 Albert–Bapaume road, but because of German underground defences it could not be dug in a straight line. About 460 metres (500 yd) were dug into no man's land, before it turned right for about another 460 metres (500 yd). About 18,000 kilograms (40,000 lb) of ammonal was placed in the chamber beneath the Y Sap mine. The Lochnagar and the Y Sap mines were "overcharged" to ensure that large rims were formed from the disturbed ground. Communication tunnels were also dug for use immediately after the first attack but were little used in the end. The mines were laid without interference by German miners but as the explosives were placed, German miners could be heard below Lochnagar and above the Y Sap mine.

Captain Stanley Bullock described the conditions of the work:

At one place in particular our men swore they thought he [the German enemy] was coming through, so we stopped driving forward and commenced to chamber in double shifts. We did not expect to complete it before he blew, but we did. A chamber 12' x 6' x 6' in 24 hours. The Germans worked for a shift more than we did and then stopped. They knew we had chambered and were afraid we should blow and no more work was done there. I used to hate going to listen in that chamber more than any other place in the mine. Half an hour, sometimes once sometimes three times a day, in deadly silence with the geophone to your ears, wondering whether the sound you heard was the Boche working silently or your own heart beating. God knows how we kept our nerves and judgement. After the Somme attack when we surveyed the German mines and connected up to our own system, with the theodolite we found that we were 5 feet apart, and that he had only started his chamber and then stopped.

— Captain Stanley Bullock, 179th Tunnelling Company

The four mines at La Boisselle were detonated at 7:28 a.m. on 1 July 1916, the first day on the Somme. The explosion of the Lochnagar mine was initiated by Captain James Young of the 179th Tunnelling Company, who pressed the switches and observed that the firing had been successful. The two charges of the Lochnagar mine created a single, vast, smooth sided, flat bottom crater measuring some 220 feet (67 metres) diameter excluding the lip, and 450 feet (137 metres) across the full extent of the lip. It had obliterated between 300 and 400 feet (91 and 122 metres) of the German dug-outs, all said to have been full of German troops. At the time, the Lochnagar mine, along with the Y Sap mine, were the largest mines ever detonated. The sound of the blast was considered the loudest man-made noise in history up to that point, with reports suggesting it was heard in London. They would be surpassed a year later by the mines in the Battle of Messines.

Despite their colossal size, the Lochnagar and Y Sap mines failed to help sufficiently neutralise the German defences in La Boisselle. The ruined village was meant to fall in 20 minutes, but by the end of the first day of the battle, it had not been taken while the III Corps divisions had lost more than 11,000 casualties. At Mash Valley, the attackers lost 5,100 men before noon, and at Sausage Valley near the crater of the Lochnagar mine, there were over 6,000 casualties – the highest concentration on the entire battlefield. The III Corps' 34th Division suffered the worst losses of any unit that day.

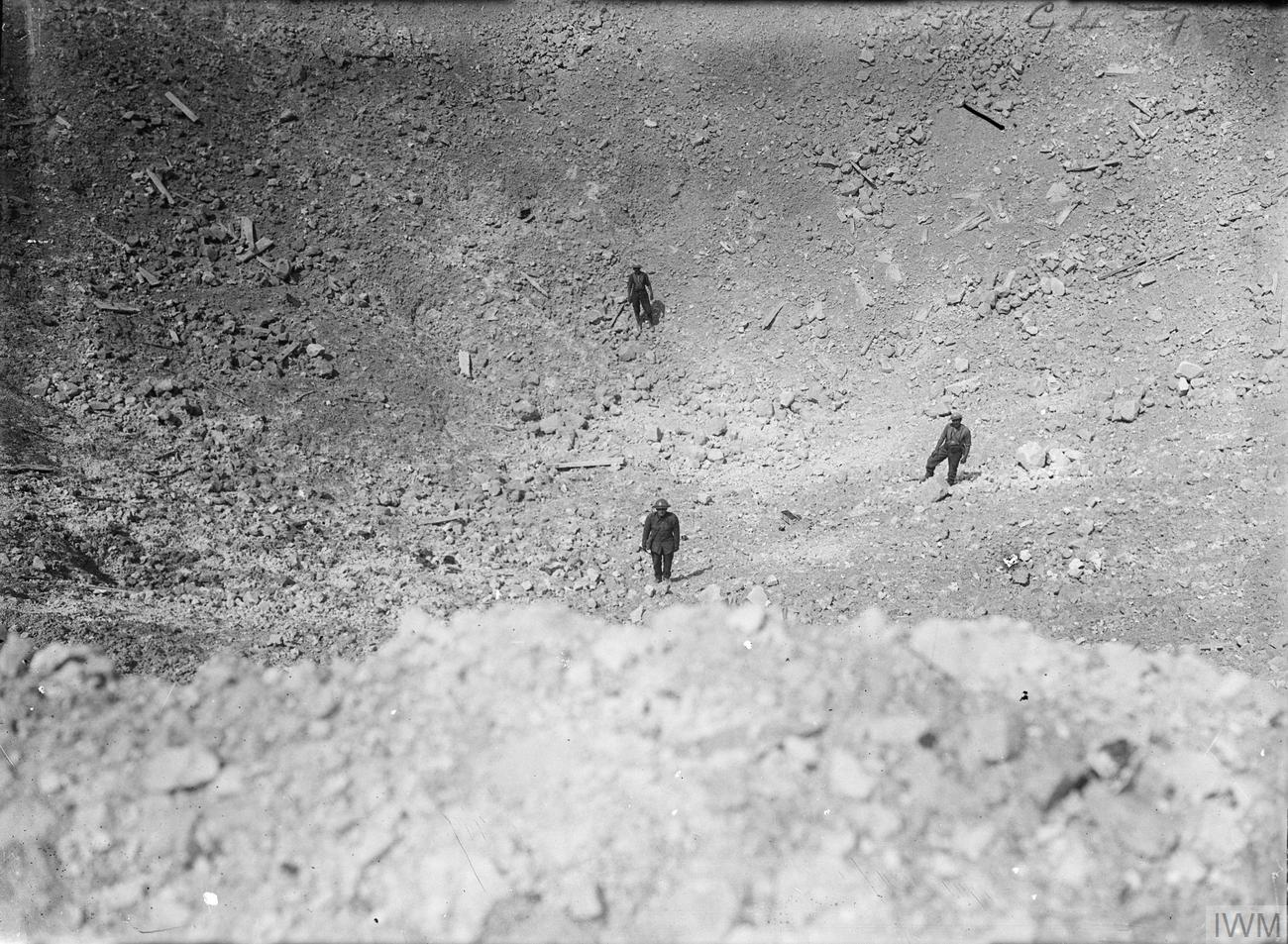
La Boisselle mine crater, August 1916

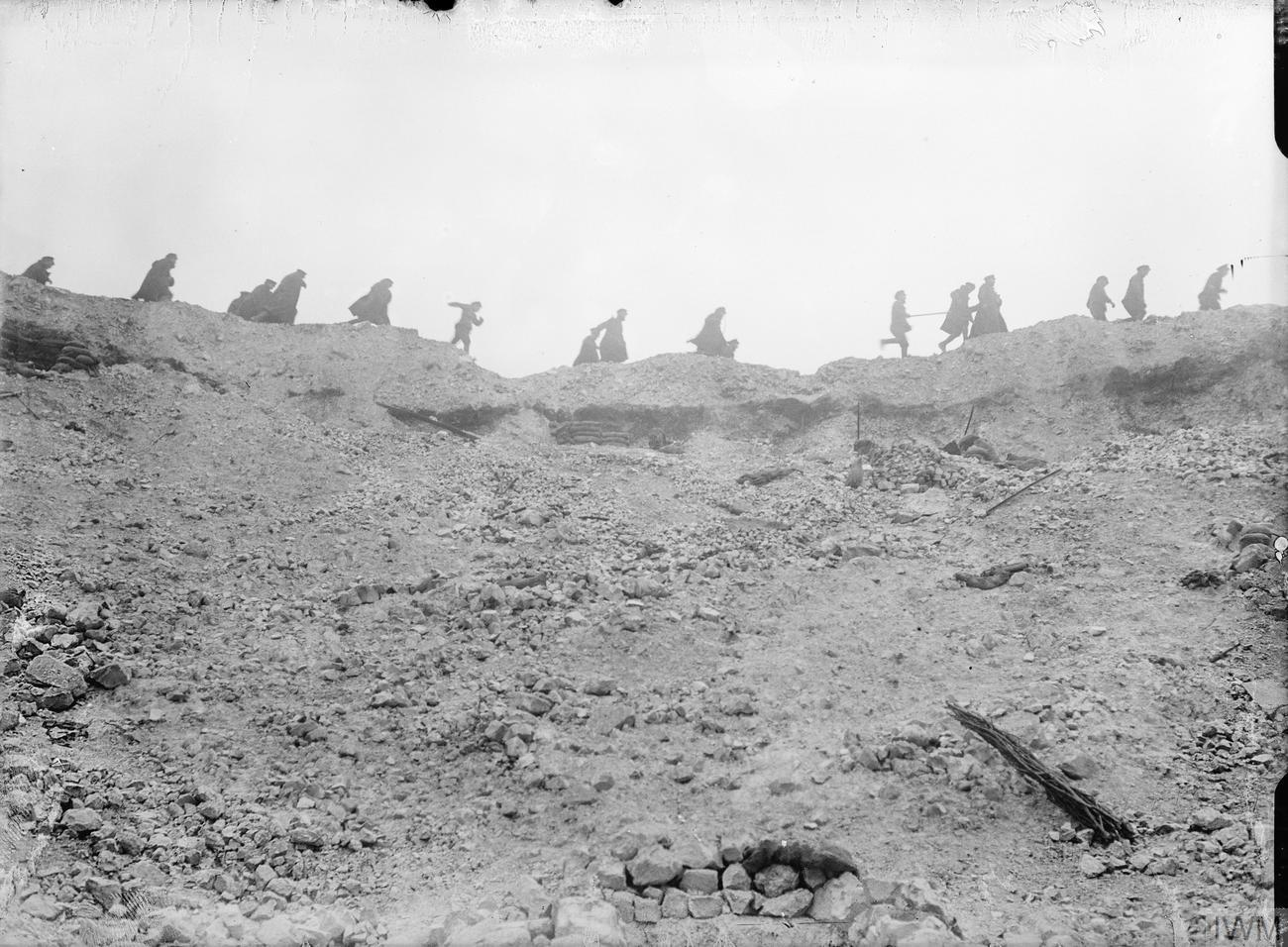
Troops passing Lochnagar Crater, October 1916

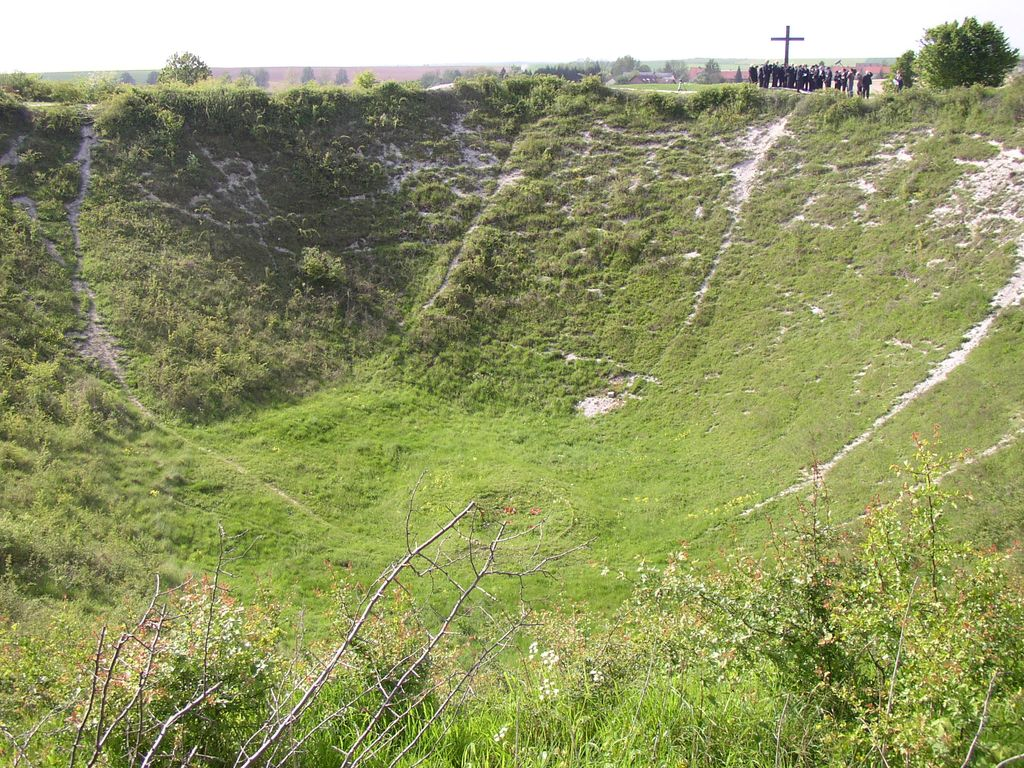
Lochnagar Crater

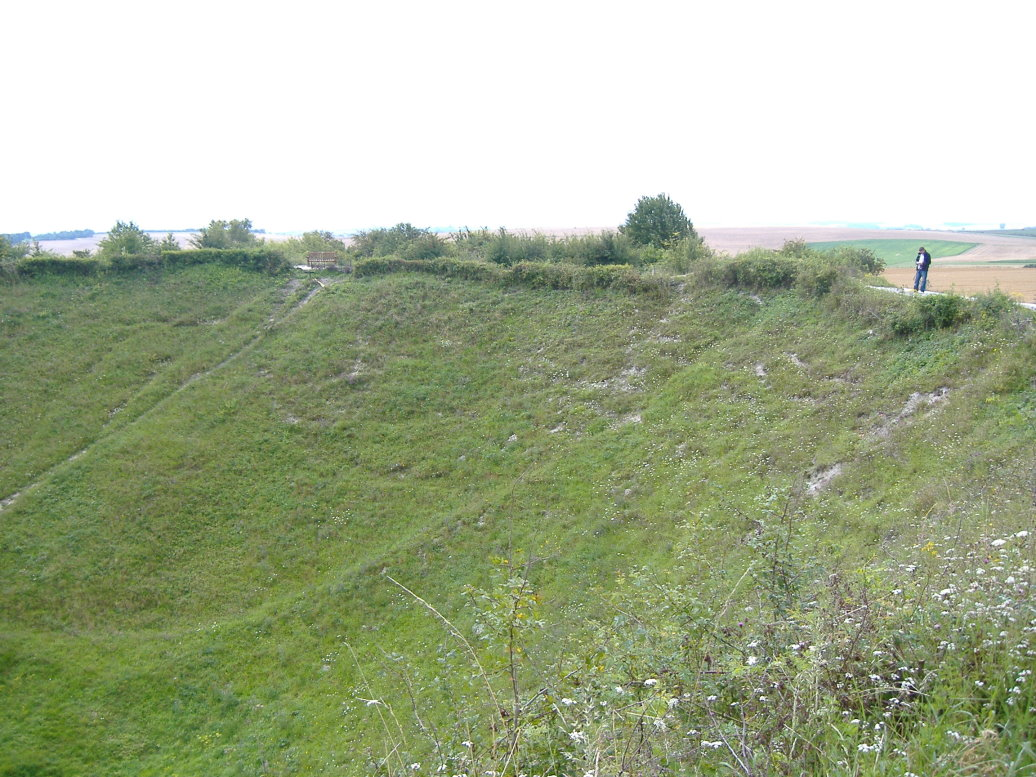
Lochnagar Crater

=== Ypres Salient ===
In spring of 1917, the 179th Tunnelling Company moved to the Ypres Canal sector near Boezinge where it commenced work on dugouts. The BEF had decided to carry out all operations in the offensive of summer 1917 from deep dugouts. East of the Ypres Canal in the close vicinity of Boezinge there were several dugouts, seven of which were finished by the 173rd or 179th Tunnelling Company. Of these, Yorkshire Trench, Butt 18, Nile Trench and Heading Lane Dugout were double battalion headquarters, Bridge 6 was a brigade headquarters, and Lancashire Farm Dugout contained two battalion and two brigade headquarters. The condition of the ground made digging the deep dugouts extremely difficult and dangerous. Work had to be carried out silently and secretly, facing an observant enemy who was only a few hundred metres away. About 180 dugout sites have been located in the Ypres Salient and in the 1990s some of them were entered, at least in part. Yorkshire Trench and its dugout were rediscovered by amateur archaeologists and systematically excavated in 1998. Although the area is now part of a large industrial estate, the location was opened to the public in 2003 (see aerial photo of the site). Yorkshire Trench is located close to the John McCrae memorial site at Essex Farm.

=== La Bassée ===
During the winter of 1917–18 the company was in the La Bassée sector, engaged in defensive tunnel warfare and in constructing deep concrete dugouts in the support line (the 'Village Line') in cooperation with 42nd (East Lancashire) Divisional Engineers. These defences enabled 55th (West Lancashire) Division to hold its ground during the subsequent German spring offensive.

Once the front had stabilised after the German offensive, British engineers began digging stronger defences. Sections of 179th Tunnelling Co assisted the field companies of 42nd (EaL) Divisional Engineers in digging deep dugouts in the Hébuterne sector.

== In popular culture ==
Thomas Shelby, protagonist of the popular BBC drama Peaky Blinders, was said to have served as a tunneller in the 179th Tunnelling Company.

== See also ==
- Mine warfare
