= 181st Tunnelling Company =

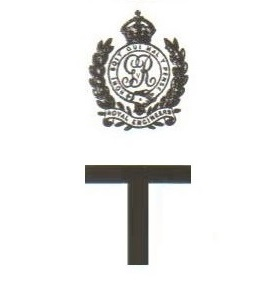
- Active: World War I
- Country: United Kingdom
- Branch: British Army
- Type: Royal Engineer tunnelling company
- Role: military engineering, tunnel warfare
- Nickname: "The Moles"
- Engagements: World War I Vimy Ridge; Battle of the Somme

The 181st Tunnelling Company was one of the tunnelling companies of the Royal Engineers created by the British Army during World War I. The tunnelling units were occupied in offensive and defensive mining involving the placing and maintaining of mines under enemy lines, as well as other underground work such as the construction of deep dugouts for troop accommodation, the digging of subways, saps (a narrow trench dug to approach enemy trenches), cable trenches and underground chambers for signals and medical services.

== Background ==
By January 1915 it had become evident to the BEF at the Western Front that the Germans were mining to a planned system. As the British had failed to develop suitable counter-tactics or underground listening devices before the war, field marshals French and Kitchener agreed to investigate the suitability of forming British mining units. Following consultations between the Engineer-in-Chief of the BEF, Brigadier George Fowke, and the mining specialist John Norton-Griffiths, the War Office formally approved the tunnelling company scheme on 19 February 1915.

Norton-Griffiths ensured that tunnelling companies numbers 170 to 177 were ready for deployment in mid-February 1915. In the spring of that year, there was constant underground fighting in the Ypres Salient at Hooge, Hill 60, Railway Wood, Sanctuary Wood, St Eloi and The Bluff which required the deployment of new drafts of tunnellers for several months after the formation of the first eight companies. The lack of suitably experienced men led to some tunnelling companies starting work later than others. The number of units available to the BEF was also restricted by the need to provide effective counter-measures to the German mining activities. To make the tunnels safer and quicker to deploy, the British Army enlisted experienced coal miners, many outside their nominal recruitment policy. The first nine companies, numbers 170 to 178, were each commanded by a regular Royal Engineers officer. These companies each comprised 5 officers and 269 sappers; they were aided by additional infantrymen who were temporarily attached to the tunnellers as required, which almost doubled their numbers. The success of the first tunnelling companies formed under Norton-Griffiths' command led to mining being made a separate branch of the Engineer-in-Chief's office under Major-General S.R. Rice, and the appointment of an 'Inspector of Mines' at the GHQ Saint-Omer office of the Engineer-in-Chief. A second group of tunnelling companies were formed from Welsh miners from the 1st and 3rd Battalions of the Monmouthshire Regiment, who were attached to the 1st Northumberland Field Company of the Royal Engineers, which was a Territorial unit. The formation of twelve new tunnelling companies, between July and October 1915, helped to bring more men into action in other parts of the Western Front.

Most tunnelling companies were formed under Norton-Griffiths' leadership during 1915, and one more was added in 1916. On 10 September 1915, the British government sent an appeal to Canada, South Africa, Australia and New Zealand to raise tunnelling companies in the Dominions of the British Empire. On 17 September, New Zealand became the first Dominion to agree the formation of a tunnelling unit. The New Zealand Tunnelling Company arrived at Plymouth on 3 February 1916 and was deployed to the Western Front in northern France. A Canadian unit was formed from men on the battlefield, plus two other companies trained in Canada and then shipped to France. Three Australian tunnelling companies were formed by March 1916, resulting in 30 tunnelling companies of the Royal Engineers being available by the summer of 1916.

== Unit history ==
=== Formation ===
Formed at Steenwerck in August 1915, and moved into the Rue du Bois sector, where it followed in the footsteps of the 174th Tunnelling Company and was itself relieved by 172nd Tunnelling Company in March 1916. From its formation until the end of the war the company served under Third Army.

=== Vimy ===
181st Tunnelling Company moved south in March 1916 to face Vimy Ridge with Company HQ in Berles.

=== Arras ===
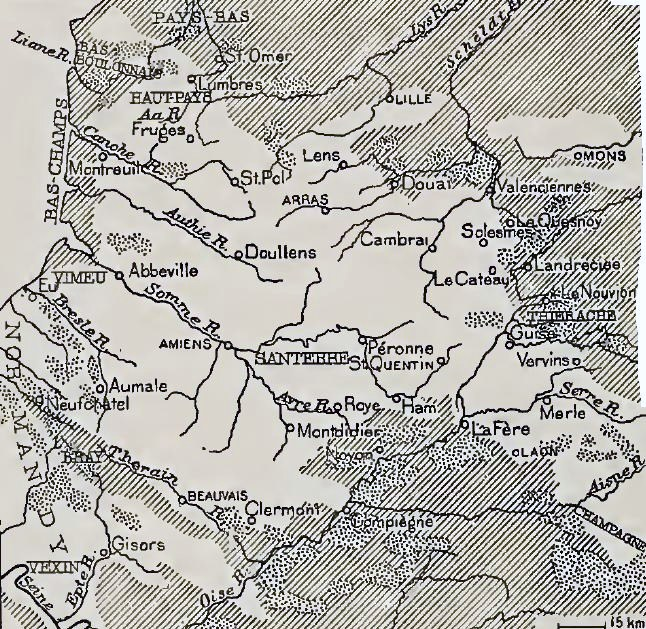
Map of chalk areas in northern France

By the time of the Battle of Vimy Ridge in spring 1917, the company were in Ronville near Arras, working in the caves and tunnels in that area. Before the Battle of Arras (9 April – 16 May 1917), the British forces controlling Arras had decided to re-use the ancient underground quarries in the town to aid a planned offensive against the Germans, whose trenches ran through what are now the eastern suburbs of the town. The underground quarries were to be linked up by tunnels so that they could be used both as shelters from the incessant German shelling and as a means of conveying troops to the front in secrecy and safety. From October 1916, the tunnelling companies of the Royal Engineers had been constructing tunnels for the troops, focusing on Carrière Wellington, a former underground quarry in Ronville near Arras. The New Zealand Tunnelling Company had carried out a first exploration of the underground quarries in the Ronville and Saint-Sauveur districts of Arras on 5 November 1916. While the New Zealanders were moving into place, the 184th Tunnelling Company began work on connection tunnels at Saint-Sauveur on 25 November 1916. The scale of this undertaking was enormous: in one sector alone four Tunnelling Companies (of 500 men each) worked around the clock in 18-hour shifts for two months. By the end of January 1917, the Royal Engineers had constructed 20 kilometres of tunnels linking the ancient underground quarries of Arras. The tunnel system could accommodate 24,000 men and was equipped with running water, electric light, kitchens, latrines, a small power station and a medical centre with a fully equipped operating theatre.

=== Somme ===
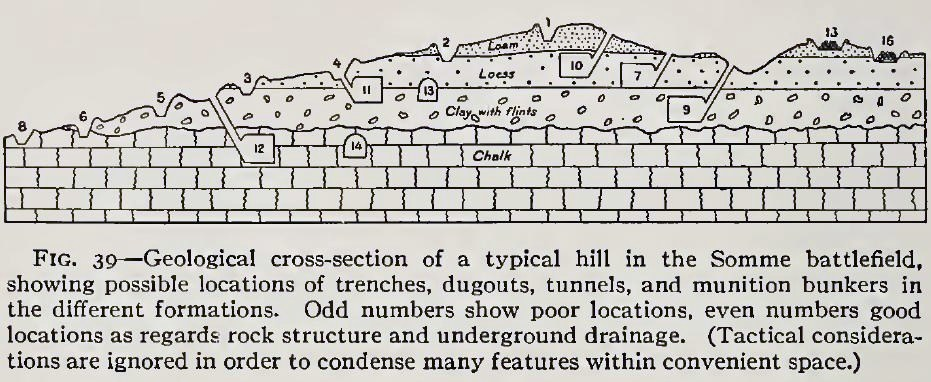
Geological cross-section of the Somme battlefield

181st Tunnelling Company also saw action at the Somme. Other tunnelling units involved in preparing the Battle of the Somme were the 174th, 178th, 179th, 183rd, 185th and 252nd companies.

== See also ==
- Mine warfare
