= 185th Tunnelling Company =

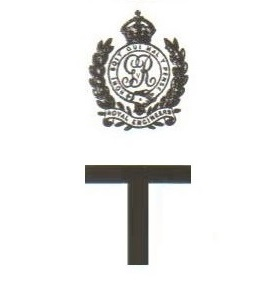
- Active: World War I
- Country: United Kingdom
- Branch: British Army
- Type: Royal Engineer tunnelling company
- Role: military engineering, tunnel warfare
- Nickname: "The Moles"
- Engagements: World War I

The 185th Tunnelling Company was one of the tunnelling companies of the Royal Engineers created by the British Army during World War I. The tunnelling units were occupied in offensive and defensive mining involving the placing and maintaining of mines under enemy lines, as well as other underground work such as the construction of deep dugouts for troop accommodation, the digging of subways, saps (a narrow trench dug to approach enemy trenches), cable trenches and underground chambers for signals and medical services.

== Background ==
By January 1915 it had become evident to the BEF at the Western Front that the Germans were mining to a planned system. As the British had failed to develop suitable counter-tactics or underground listening devices before the war, field marshals French and Kitchener agreed to investigate the suitability of forming British mining units. Following consultations between the Engineer-in-Chief of the BEF, Brigadier George Fowke, and the mining specialist John Norton-Griffiths, the War Office formally approved the tunnelling company scheme on 19 February 1915.

Norton-Griffiths ensured that tunnelling companies numbers 170 to 177 were ready for deployment in mid-February 1915. In the spring of that year, there was constant underground fighting in the Ypres Salient at Hooge, Hill 60, Railway Wood, Sanctuary Wood, St Eloi and The Bluff which required the deployment of new drafts of tunnellers for several months after the formation of the first eight companies. The lack of suitably experienced men led to some tunnelling companies starting work later than others. The number of units available to the BEF was also restricted by the need to provide effective counter-measures to the German mining activities. To make the tunnels safer and quicker to deploy, the British Army enlisted experienced coal miners, many outside their nominal recruitment policy. The first nine companies, numbers 170 to 178, were each commanded by a regular Royal Engineers officer. These companies each comprised 5 officers and 269 sappers; they were aided by additional infantrymen who were temporarily attached to the tunnellers as required, which almost doubled their numbers. The success of the first tunnelling companies formed under Norton-Griffiths' command led to mining being made a separate branch of the Engineer-in-Chief's office under Major-General S.R. Rice, and the appointment of an 'Inspector of Mines' at the GHQ Saint-Omer office of the Engineer-in-Chief. A second group of tunnelling companies were formed from Welsh miners from the 1st and 3rd Battalions of the Monmouthshire Regiment, who were attached to the 1st Northumberland Field Company of the Royal Engineers, which was a Territorial unit. The formation of twelve new tunnelling companies, between July and October 1915, helped to bring more men into action in other parts of the Western Front.

Most tunnelling companies were formed under Norton-Griffiths' leadership during 1915, and one more was added in 1916. On 10 September 1915, the British government sent an appeal to Canada, South Africa, Australia and New Zealand to raise tunnelling companies in the Dominions of the British Empire. On 17 September, New Zealand became the first Dominion to agree the formation of a tunnelling unit. The New Zealand Tunnelling Company arrived at Plymouth on 3 February 1916 and was deployed to the Western Front in northern France. A Canadian unit was formed from men on the battlefield, plus two other companies trained in Canada and then shipped to France. Three Australian tunnelling companies were formed by March 1916, resulting in 30 tunnelling companies of the Royal Engineers being available by the summer of 1916.

== Unit history ==
=== Somme 1915/16 ===
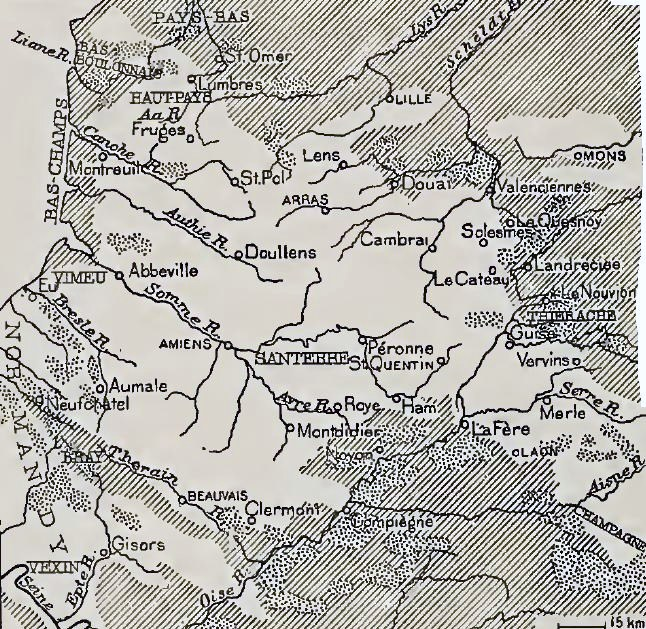
Map of chalk areas in northern France

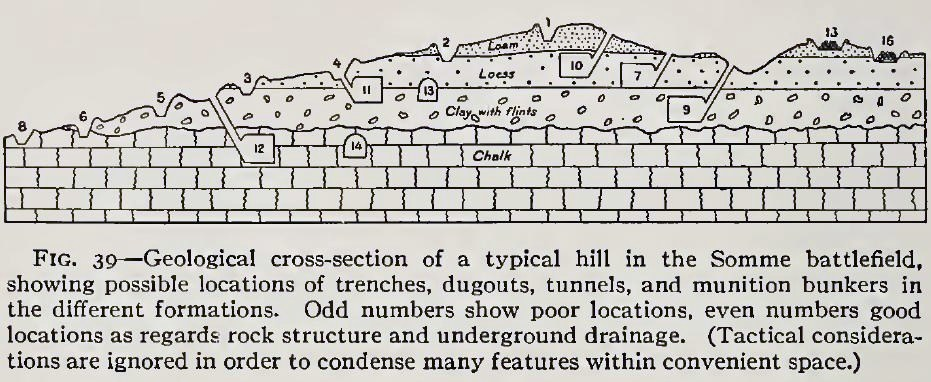
Geological cross-section of the Somme battlefield

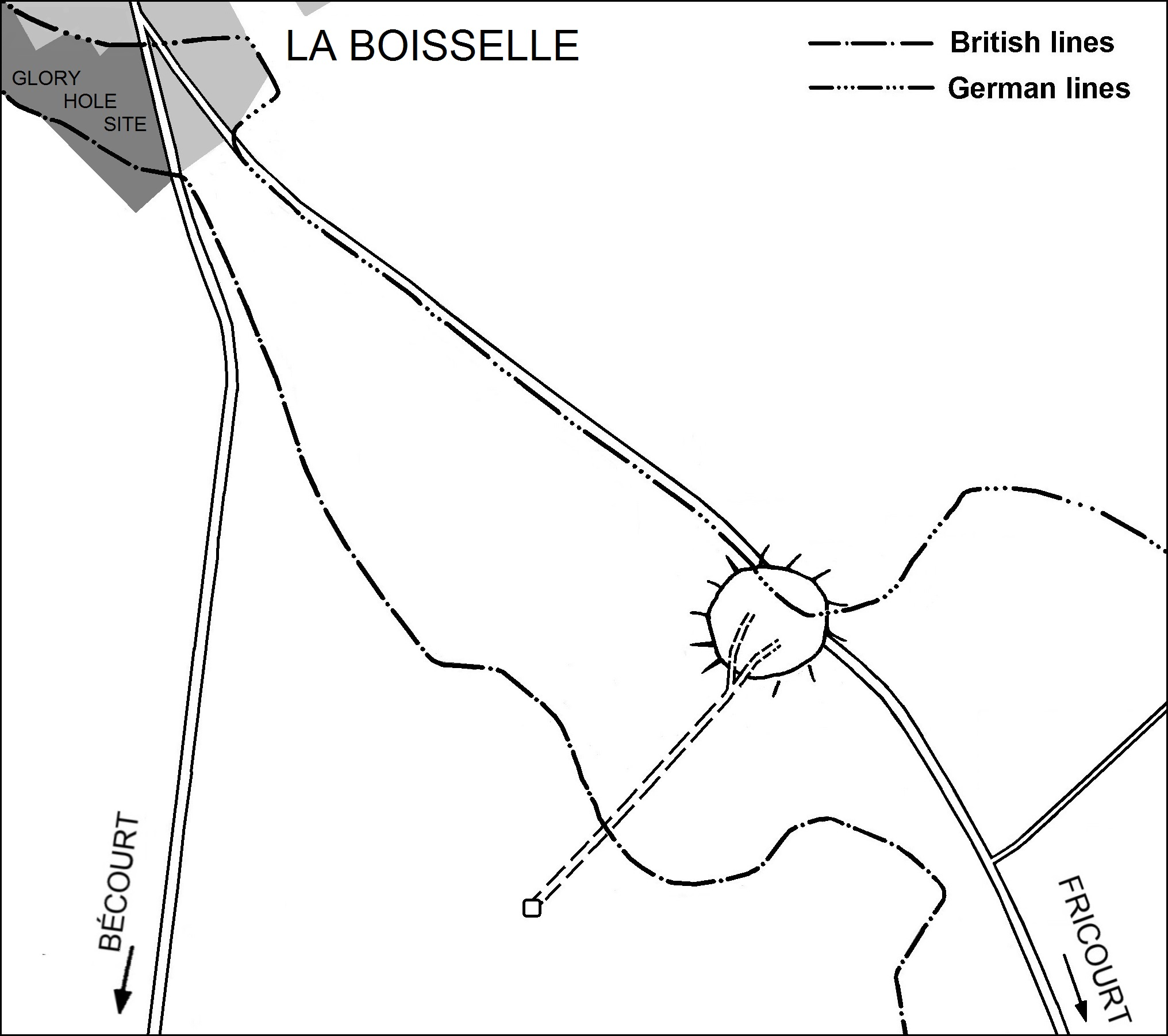
Plan of the area south of La Boisselle with locations of the Glory Hole (top left) and the Lochnagar mine; for an aerial view of the site with marked front lines, see here

185th Tunnelling Company was formed in Rouen in October 1915, moved immediately to the Somme area, for work at La Boisselle. From its formation until the end of the war the company served under First Army.

In the Somme sector of the Western Front, local but very fierce underground fighting had taken place in the winter of 1914 and spring of 1915 at La Boisselle, Fricourt, Bois Français and Carnoy. Fowke moved the 174th and 183rd Tunnelling Companies there to relieve the French engineers, but the British did not have enough miners to take over the large number of French shafts and the French agreed to leave their engineers at work for several weeks. To provide the tunnellers needed, the British formed the 178th and 179th Tunnelling Companies in August 1915, followed by the 185th and 252nd Tunnelling Companies in October. The 181st Tunnelling Company was also present on the Somme.

Early attempts at mining by the British on the Western Front had commenced in late 1914 in the soft clay and sandy soils of Flanders. Mining at La Boisselle was in chalk, much harder and requiring different techniques. The German advance had been halted at La Boisselle by French troops on 28 September 1914. There was bitter fighting for possession of the village cemetery, and for farm buildings on the south-western edge of the village, known as "L'îlot de La Boisselle" to the French, as "Granathof" (German: "shell farm") to the Germans and as "Glory Hole" to the British. In December 1914, French engineers had begun tunnelling beneath the ruins. With the war on the surface at stalemate, both sides continued to probe beneath the opponent's trenches and detonate ever-greater explosive charges. In August 1915, the French and Germans were working at a depth of 12 metres (39 ft); the size of their charges had reached 3,000 kilograms (6,600 lb). The British extended and deepened the system, first to 24 metres (79 ft) and ultimately 30 metres (98 ft). Above ground the infantry occupied trenches just 45 metres (148 ft) apart. Around La Boisselle, the Germans had dug defensive transversal tunnels at a depth of about 80 feet (24 metres), parallel to the front line.

As Allied preparations for the Battle of the Somme (1 July – 18 November 1916) were begun, the tunnelling companies were to make two major contributions by placing 19 large and small mines beneath the German positions along the front line and by preparing a series of shallow Russian saps from the British front line into no man's land, which would be opened at zero hour and allow the infantry to attack the German positions from a comparatively short distance. Four mines were planned at La Boisselle: Two 3,600-kilogram (8,000 lb) charges (known as No 2 straight and No 5 right) were planted at L'îlot, intended to wreck German tunnels and create crater lips to block enfilade fire along no man's land. To assist the attack on the village, two further mines, known as Y Sap and Lochnagar after the trenches from which they were dug, were laid to the north-east and the south-east of La Boisselle on either side of the German salient – see map. 185th Tunnelling Company started work on the Lochnagar mine on 11 November 1915, and eventually handed the tunnels over to 179th Tunnelling Company in March 1916, which finished and fired it. A month before the handover, eighteen men of the 185th Tunnelling Company (2 officers, 16 sappers) died to a German camouflet at La Boisselle on 4 February 1916.

=== Vimy 1916/17 ===
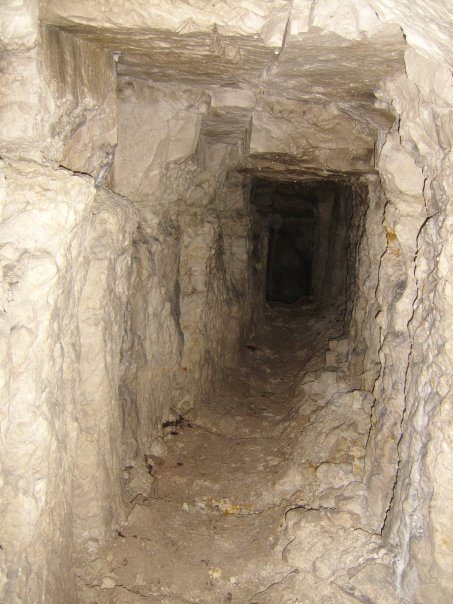
British-dug fighting tunnel in Vimy sector

185th Tunnelling Company next moved to the "Labyrinth" sector near Vimy in March 1916. The German "Labyrinth" stronghold was located near Neuville-Saint-Vaast, between Arras and Vimy and not far from Notre Dame de Lorette. 185th Tunnelling Company seems to have shared this sector with the 176th Tunnelling Company, which had moved to Neuville-Saint-Vaast in April 1916 and remained there for a considerable time, and the 172nd Tunnelling Company, which was relieved in this area by the 2nd Australian Tunnelling Company in May 1916.

The front sectors at Vimy and Arras, where extremely heavy fighting between the French and the Germans had taken place during 1915, had been taken over by the British in March 1916. Vimy, in particular, was an area of busy underground activity. British tunnellers progressively took over military mining in the area from the French between February and May 1916. Other units active around Vimy were 175th, 182nd, 184th and 255th Tunnelling Companies. From spring 1916, the British had deployed five tunnelling companies along the Vimy Ridge, and during the first two months of their tenure in the area, 70 mines were fired, mostly by the Germans. Between October 1915 and April 1917 an estimated 150 French, British and German charges were fired in this 7 kilometres (4.3 mi) sector of the Western Front.

On 29 March 1916, the 185th Tunnelling Company was relieved at Roclincourt-Chantecler by the New Zealand Tunnelling Company. During summer and much of autumn 1916, the unit further developed and expanded its mining to create an effective underground defence at Roclincourt-Chantecler. In May 1916, a German infantry attack at Vimy, which forced the British back 640 metres (700 yd), was aimed at neutralising British mining activity by capturing the shaft entrances. From June 1916, however, the Germans withdrew many miners to work on the Hindenburg Line and also for work in coal mines in Germany. In the second half of 1916 the British constructed strong defensive underground positions, and from August 1916, the Royal Engineers developed a mining scheme to support a large-scale infantry attack on the Vimy Ridge proposed for autumn 1916, although this was subsequently postponed. After September 1916, when the Royal Engineers had completed their network of defensive galleries along most of the front line, offensive mining largely ceased although activities continued until 1917. The British gallery network beneath Vimy Ridge eventually grew to a length of 12 kilometres (7.5 mi).

The Canadian Corps was posted to the northern part of Vimy Ridge in October 1916 and preparations for an attack were revived in February 1917. 185th Tunnelling Company then dug subways near Neuville-Saint-Vaast in early 1917. Prior to the Battle of Vimy Ridge (9 – 12 April 1917), the British tunnelling companies secretly laid a series of explosive charges under German positions in an effort to destroy surface fortifications before the assault. The original plan had called for 17 mines and 9 Wombat charges to support the infantry attack, of which 13 (possibly 14) mines and 8 Wombat charges were eventually laid. At the same time, 19 crater groups existed along this section of the Western Front, each with several large craters. In order to assess the consequences of infantry having to advance across cratered ground after a mining attack, officers from the Canadian Corps visited La Boisselle and Fricourt where the mines on the first day of the Somme had been blown. Their reports and the experience of the Canadians at St Eloi in April 1916 – where mines had so altered and damaged the landscape as to render occupation of the mine craters by the infantry all but impossible –, led to the decision to remove offensive mining from the central sector allocated to the Canadian Corps at Vimy Ridge. Further British mines in the area were vetoed following the blowing by the Germans on 23 March 1917 of nine craters along no man's land as it was probable that the Germans were aiming to restrict an Allied attack to predictable points. The three mines already laid by 172nd Tunnelling Company were also dropped from the British plans. They were left in place after the assault and were only removed in the 1990s. Another mine, prepared by 176th Tunnelling Company against the German strongpoint known as the Pimple, was not completed in time for the attack. The gallery had been pushed silently through the clay, avoiding the sandy and chalky layers of the Vimy Ridge, but by 9 April 1917 was still 21 metres (70 ft) short of its target. In the end, two mines were blown before the attack, while three mines and two Wombat charges were fired to support the attack, including those forming a northern flank.

=== Douai 1918 ===
Units of 185th Tunnelling Company were the first British troops to enter Douai, on 17 October 1918, during the great advance to victory.

== See also ==
- Mine warfare

== Bibliography ==
- Banning, J.; et al. (2011). "Tunnellers". La Boisselle Study Group.
- Dunning, R. (2015). "Military Mining". Lochnagar Crater. Archived from the original on 27 June 2015.
- Jones, Simon (2010). Underground Warfare 1914–1918. Pen & Sword Military. ISBN 978-1-84415-962-8.
- Shakespear, J. (2001) [1921]. The Thirty-Fourth Division, 1915–1919: The Story of its Career from Ripon to the Rhine (Naval & Military Press ed.). London: H. F. & G. Witherby. ISBN 1-84342-050-3. OCLC 6148340. Archived from the original on 22 December 2019.
