= Norton-Griffiths baronets =

Baronetcy in the Baronetage of the United Kingdom

The Norton-Griffiths Baronetcy, of Wonham in the parish Betchworth in the County of Surrey, is a title in the Baronetage of the United Kingdom. It was created on 14 June 1922 for the soldier, businessman and Conservative politician John Norton-Griffiths. Born John Griffiths, he had assumed by deed poll the additional surname of Norton in 1917.

== Norton-Griffiths baronets, of Wonham (1922) ==
- Sir John Norton-Griffiths, 1st Baronet (1871–1930)
- Sir Peter Norton-Griffiths, 2nd Baronet (1905–1983)
- Sir John Norton-Griffiths, 3rd Baronet (1938–2017)
- Sir Michael Norton-Griffiths, 4th Baronet (born 1941)

The heir apparent is the present holder's son Alastair Norton-Griffiths (born 1976). The heir apparent's heir apparent is his son Jack Norton-Griffiths.
