= George Fowke =

British Army general (1863–1936)

Lieutenant-General Sir George Fowke KCB KCMG
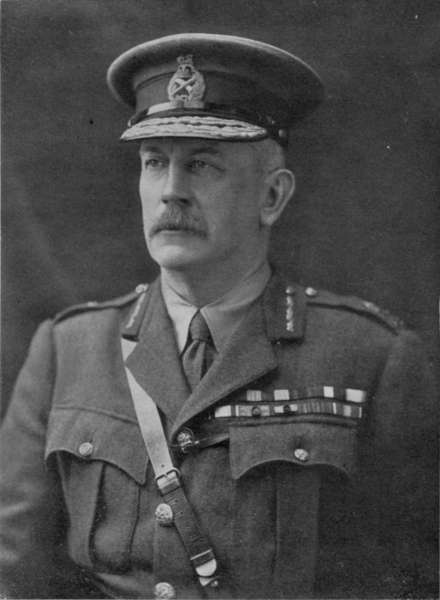
- Born: 10 September 1864; Halstead, Essex
- Died: 8 February 1936 (aged 71); Dinard, France
- Military career
- Allegiance: United Kingdom
- Branch: British Army
- Service years: 1884–1922
- Rank: Lieutenant-General
- Unit: Royal Engineers
- Commands: Engineer-in-Chief, BEF; Adjutant-General, BEF
- Conflicts: Second Boer War; Siege of Ladysmith; World War I
- Awards: Knight Commander of the Order of the Bath; Knight Commander of the Order of St Michael and St George; Mentioned in Despatches

Lieutenant-General Sir George Henry Fowke, KCB, KCMG (10 September 1864 – 8 February 1936) was a British Army officer who served on the staff of the British Expeditionary Force during World War I.

== Biography ==
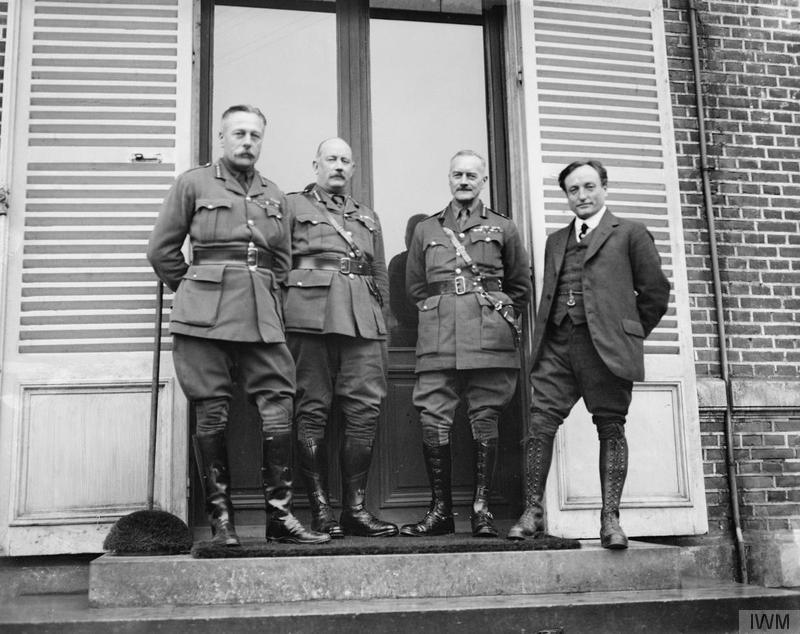
From left to right: General Sir Douglas Haig, C-in-C of the BEF, Lieutenant General Sir George Fowke, adjutant general of the BEF, Lieutenant General Sir Ronald Maxwell, Quartermaster-General of the BEF, and Ben Tillett, trade union leader and founding member of the Labour Party, at Beauquesne, France, November 1916.

Fowke joined the Royal Engineers as a lieutenant on 15 February 1884, and was promoted to captain on 19 July 1892. He saw active service in South Africa during the Second Boer War, where he was present at the Defence of Ladysmith, for which he was mentioned in despatches. During the war he received a brevet promotion to major on 29 November 1900, and was confirmed with the substantive rank of major on 22 February 1901. The war ended in June 1902 with the Peace of Vereeniging, and for his service he received a brevet promotion as lieutenant-colonel on 22 August 1902.

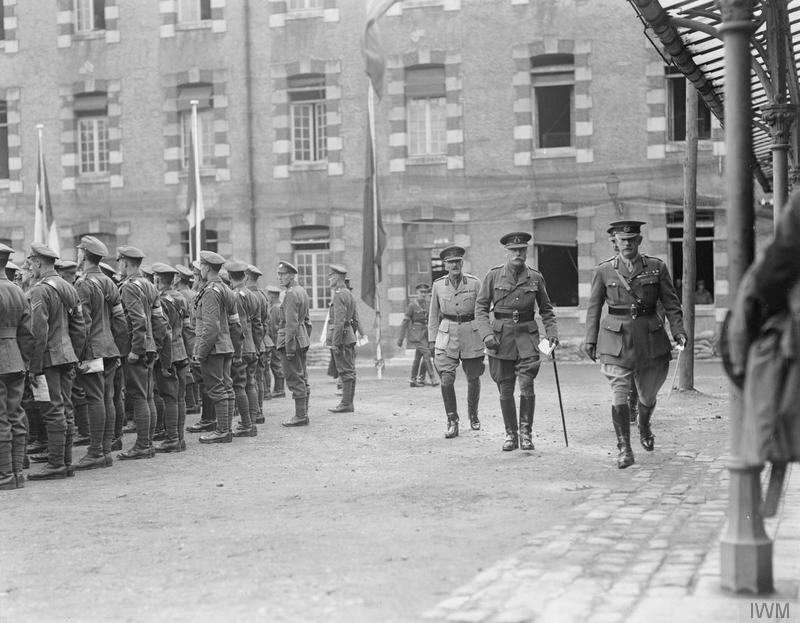
Field Marshal Sir Douglas Haig attending service on the fourth anniversary of the declaration of war at Montreuil, France, 4 August 1918. Stood to his left is Lieutenant General Fowke, the BEF's adjutant general.

After the war, he stayed in South Africa and was appointed as Director of Public Works in the Transvaal and was a member of the Transvaal Legislative Council from 1902 to 1904. During the Russo-Japanese War, he was an observer attached to the Imperial Japanese Army in Manchuria, and then lectured on fortifications at the School of Military Engineering. After being made a brevet colonel in August 1908, and then to lieutenant colonel in October, he was appointed the assistant adjutant general at the War Office in June 1910. He was made a colonel with effect from the same date.

He then succeeded Colonel Frederick Heath as inspector of Royal Engineers in April 1913, which saw him advanced to the rank of temporary brigadier general.

On the outbreak of the First World War in August 1914, he was promoted again to the temporary rank of brigadier general and appointed to the post of brigadier general, Royal Engineers in the British Expeditionary Force, the senior engineering advisor. As the war settled into a stalemate it became apparent that the Royal Engineers would play a significant role in trench warfare, and the position was changed to chief engineer in January 1915 and then to engineer-in-chief, for which he was raised to the temporary rank of major general in April 1915. He was made a Companion of the Order of the Bath in February 1915 and his major general's rank became substantive in June and rewarded "for distinguished service in the Field". It was in this position, that he agreed the formation of the Royal Engineer tunnelling companies, after a proposal from John Norton-Griffiths.

In February 1916, he succeeded Lieutenant General Sir Nevil Macready in the important post of adjutant general of the BEF and was raised to temporary lieutenant general while so employed. He held this post until the end of the war, and, having been made a substantive lieutenant general in January 1919, retired from the army in April 1922.

In addition to his British decorations and awards, he was also awarded the Army Distinguished Service Medal by the United States, with the citation for the medal reading:

The President of the United States of America, authorized by Act of Congress, July 9, 1918, takes pleasure in presenting the Army Distinguished Service Medal to Lieutenant General George H. Fowke, Royal British Army, for exceptionally meritorious and distinguished service in a position of great responsibility to the Government of the United States, during World War I. While serving as Adjutant General, British Expeditionary Services, General Fowke rendered invaluable service to the American Expeditionary Forces and to the cause in which the United States has been engaged.

== Personal life ==
Sir George Henry Fowke, a maternal uncle of Carlo Ippolito Migliorini, attended his engagement ceremony with Véra Ivanovna Sanine, alongside Lord Louis Mountbatten and Lady Edwina Mountbatten.
