= List of battalions of the South Wales Borderers =

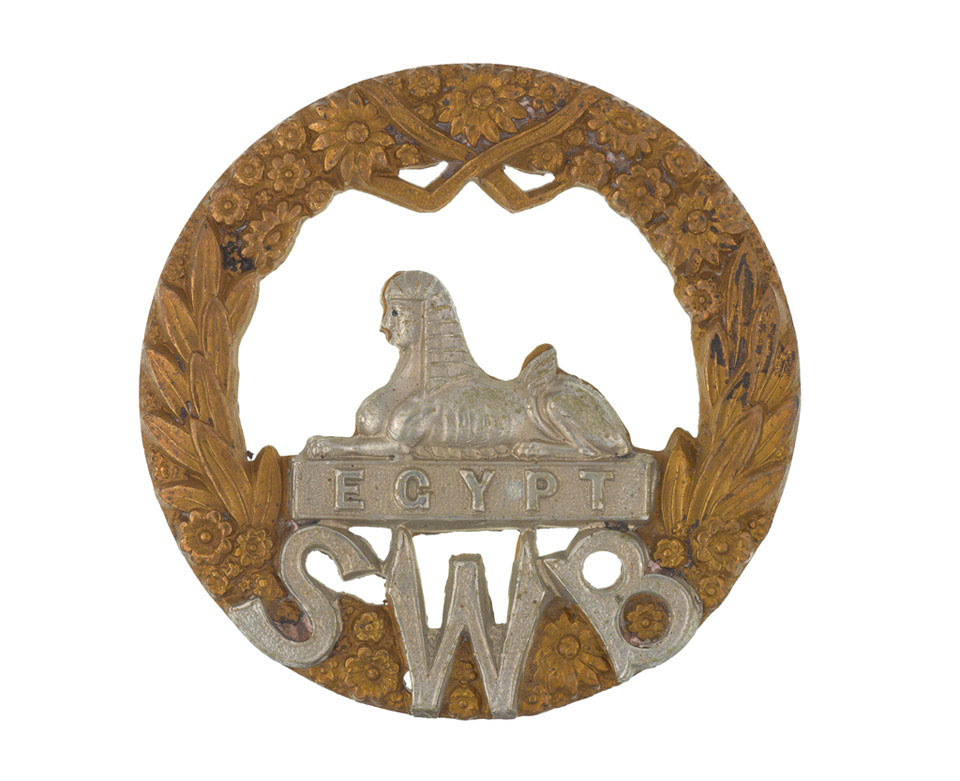
c. 1896 cap badge for other ranks of the South Wales Borderers

This is a list of battalions of the South Wales Borderers from its formation in 1881 until its final amalgamation in 1969.

== Origin of the regiment ==
First formed in 1689 and originally known by the names of its colonels, the 24th Foot received its number in 1751 and its subtitle '(2nd Warwickshire)' in 1782. The 2nd Battalion existed from 1804 to 1814 and was reformed in 1858. Under the 'Localisation of the Forces' scheme introduced in 1872 by the Cardwell Reforms, each regiment of the line established a permanent depot in a county or region, to which the local militia and volunteer battalions were affiliated. The 24th Foot's links to Warwickshire were tenuous, and it was assigned to Sub-District No 25 (Counties of Cardigan, Radnor and Monmouth) in South Wales. The depot was at Brecon, already the headquarters of the Royal South Wales Borderers Militia (Royal Brecon and Radnor Rifles). Under the Childers Reforms of 1881 the line regiments lost their numbers and received an appropriate local title, forming a single regiment with the militia and volunteers, which became numbered battalions. Unusually, the 24th Foot adopted the title of one of its militia battalions and became the South Wales Borderers in Regimental District No 24.

== 1881–1908 ==
After its formation in 1881 the battalions were as follows:

=== Regular ===
- 1st Battalion
- 2nd Battalion

=== Militia ===
- 3rd (Royal South Wales Borderers Militia) Battalion - formerly the Royal South Wales Borderers Militia (Royal Radnor and Brecknock Rifles)
- 4th (Royal Montgomeryshire Militia) Battalion - formerly the Royal Montgomeryshire Rifles; disbanded in 1908

=== Volunteer ===
- 1st Brecknockshire Rifle Volunteers – renamed 1st (Brecknockshire) Volunteer Battalion in 1885
- 1st Monmouthshire Rifle Volunteers – renamed 2nd (Monmouthshire) Volunteer Battalion in 1885
- 2nd Monmouthshire Rifle Volunteers – renamed 3rd (Monmouthshire) Volunteer Battalion in 1885
- 3rd Monmouthshire Rifle Volunteers – renamed 4th (Monmouthshire) Volunteer Battalion in 1885
- 5th (Montgomeryshire) Volunteer Battalion – raised in 1897

== 1908 ==
Under the Haldane Reforms of 1908 the militia was converted into the Special Reserve (SR), tasked with providing reinforcement drafts to the regular battalions in time of war. At the same time the volunteers became part of the Territorial Force (TF). In the case of the South Wales Borderers, the 4th Battalion was disbanded, and some of the volunteer battalions were withdrawn. The Monmouthshire battalions formed a new all-TF regiment, the Monmouthshire Regiment, which nevertheless remained part of the 'corps' of the South Wales Borderers. The 5th (Montgomeryshire) Volunteer Battalion ceased to be part of the South Wales Borderers, and was transferred to the Royal Welsh Fusiliers to form the bulk of the 7th (Merionethshire & Montgomeryshire) Battalion of that regiment. Unusually, the remaining TF battalion of the SWB, the Brecknockshire Battalion, was named rather than numbered.

=== South Wales Borderers ===
- 1st Battalion (Reg)
- 2nd Battalion (Reg)
- 3rd (Reserve) Battalion (SR) – formerly the 3rd Militia Battalion
- The Brecknockshire Battalion (TF) - formerly the 1st Volunteer Battalion

=== Monmouthshire Regiment ===
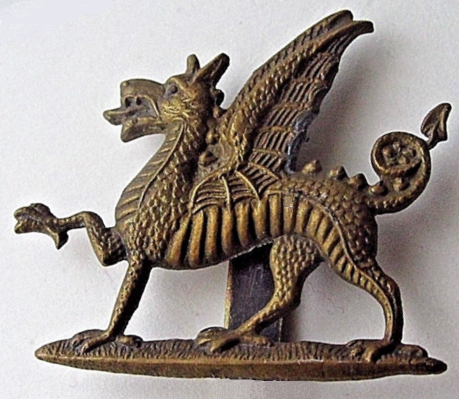
Cap badge of the Monmouthshire Regiment.

- 1st (Rifle) Battalion, The Monmouthshire Regiment (TF) – formerly the 2nd Volunteer Battalion
- 2nd Battalion, The Monmouthshire Regiment (TF) - formerly the 3rd Volunteer Battalion
- 3rd Battalion, The Monmouthshire Regiment (TF) - formerly the 4th Volunteer Battalion

== World War I ==
During World War I the British Army's regimental system was vastly increased. The TF formed 2nd Line and 3rd Line (Reserve) battalions, and the 'Kitchener's Army' recruits formed new Service battalions. During the war the South Wales Borderers had a total of 21 battalions, the Monmouths a further 10. All of the new battalions were either disbanded during the war or in its immediate aftermath:

- 1st Battalion – served with 1st Division on the Western Front
- 2nd Battalion – served in the Siege of Tsingtao, then joined 29th Division and served at Gallipoli and on the Western Front
- 3rd (Reserve) Battalion (SR) – remained in the UK
- 1/1st Brecknockshire Battalion (TF) – went to India with 44th (Home Counties) Division and served in Aden
- 2/1st Brecknockshire Battalion (TF) – formed in September 1914 at Brecon; joined the 68th (2nd Welsh) Division in 1915; absorbed by the 2/7th Royal Welsh Fusiliers in November 1916.
- 3/1st Brecknockshire Battalion (TF) – formed in April 1915 at Brecon; became 1st (Reserve) Battalion in April 1916; amalgamated with the 1st (Reserve) Battalion, Monmouthshires, in August 1917
- 4th (Service) Battalion – formed in August 1914 at Brecon; joined 13th (Western) Division and saw service at Gallipoli and in Mesopotamia
- 5th (Service, later Pioneer) Battalion – formed in September 1914 at Brecon; joined 19th (Western) Division and saw service on the Western Front
- 6th (Service, later Pioneer) Battalion – formed in September 1914 at Brecon; joined 25th Division, transferred to 30th Division, seeing service on the Western Front
- 7th (Service) Battalion - formed in September 1914 at Brecon; joined 22nd Division and saw service at Salonika
- 8th (Service) Battalion – formed in September 1914 at Brecon; also joined 22nd Division and saw service at Salonika
- 9th (Service, later Reserve) Battalion – formed in October 1914 at Pembroke Dock; later became 57th (Training Reserve) Battalion of the 13th Reserve Brigade
- 10th (Service) Battalion (1st Gwent) – formed in December 1914 at Ebbw Vale; joined 43rd Division (later 38th (Welsh) Division) and saw service on the Western Front
- 11th (Service) Battalion (2nd Gwent) – formed in December 1914 at Brecon; also joined the 43rd (later 38th (Welsh)) Division and saw service on the Western Front; disbanded in February 1918 in France
- 12th (Service) Battalion (3rd Gwent) – formed in March 1915 as a Bantam battalion of the Welsh Bantam Brigade; joined the 40th Division in September and saw service on the Western Front, where it was disbanded in February 1918
- 13th (Reserve) Battalion - formed in July 1915 at Abertillery, Monmouthshire as a local reserve battalion for the 10th and 11th Battalions; became 59th (Training Reserve) Battalion, 13th Reserve Brigade in September 1916
- 14th (Reserve) Battalion – formed in September 1915 at Prees Heath as a local reserve battalion from the depot company of 12th Battalion (Bantams); in September 1916 became 65th (Training Reserve) Battalion, part of the 14th Reserve Brigade
- 15th (Service) Battalion – formed in June 1918 at North Walsham; in July absorbed the cadre of the 10th Cheshires
- 51st (Graduated) Battalion, South Wales Borderers – formed from a training unit (originally 12th (Reserve) Battalion, Welsh Regiment) 1917; became a service battalion 1919
- 52nd (Graduated) Battalion, South Wales Borderers – formed from a training unit (originally 9th (Service) Battalion) 1917; became a service battalion 1919
- 53rd (Young Soldier) Battalion, South Wales Borderers – formed from a training unit 1917
- 1/1st Battalion, Monmouthshire Regiment – part of 53rd (Welsh) Division; joined 28th Division on Western Front May 1915; to 46th (North Midland) Division as pioneer battalion, September 1915
- 2/1st Battalion, Monmouthshire Regiment – formed in September 1914 at Newport; joined 68th (2nd Welsh) Division and remained in the UK for the duration of the war; disbanded in March 1918
- 3/1st Battalion, Monmouthshire Regiment – formed in February 1915 at Abergavenny; became a reserve battalion in April 1916; absorbed the 3/2nd and 3/3rd Monmouthshires in July 1917, all of which had identical histories to the 3/1st; remained in the UK for the duration of the war
- 1/2nd Battalion, Monmouthshire Regiment – part of 53rd (Welsh) Division; joined 4th Division on Western Front November 1914; to 29th Division as pioneer battalion, May 1916
- 2/2nd Battalion, Monmouthshire Regiment – formed in September 1914 at Pontypool; joined 68th (2nd Welsh) Division and remained in the UK; disbanded in April 1919
- 3/2nd Battalion, Monmouthshire Regiment – see 3/1st Bn
- 1/3rd Battalion, Monmouthshire Regiment – part of 53rd (Welsh) Division; joined 28th Division on Western Front May 1915; to 49th (West Riding) Division as pioneer battalion September 1915; nrken up and drafted to 1/1st and 1/2nd Bns August 1916
- 2/3rd Battalion, Monmouthshire Regiment – formed in September 1914 at Abergavenny; joined 68th (2nd Welsh) Division and remained in the UK; disbanded August 1917.
- 4th Battalion, Monmouthshire Regiment – formed in 1916 as 48th Provisional Battalion from home service personnel of the Monmouthshire and Herefordshire Regiments; became 4th Monmouths January 1917; remained in the UK for the duration of the war

== Interwar ==
After demobilisation the SR battalions (renamed Militia in 1921) remained on the Army List but were inactive; they were finally disbanded in 1953. The TF was reformed in 1920 and was reorganised as the Territorial Army (TA) in 1921–22:

- 1st (Rifle) Battalion, Monmouthshire Regiment (TA) – converted to searchlight role in 1938 and transferred to Royal Artillery as 68th (Monmouthshire Regiment) Searchlight Regiment in 1940
- 2nd Battalion, Monmouthshire Regiment (TA)
- 3rd Brecknockshire and Monmouthshire Battalion (TA) – formed in 1922 when the Brecknockshire Battalion was absorbed by the 3rd Battalion, Monmouthshires; subtitle dropped when new Brecknockshire Battalion formed 1939

== World War II ==
Just before the outbreak of World War II the TA was doubled in size and battalions formed duplicates. There was also a number of war-formed units:

=== South Wales Borderers ===
- 1st Battalion – reduced to cadre in Cyprus August 1942, most of the unit having been taken prisoner or becoming casualties with 10th Indian Division in the Western Desert Campaign (see 4th Monmouth below)
- 2nd Battalion– served in the Norwegian campaign, landed on D-Day and served through the North West Europe campaign
- 5th (Home Defence) Battalion (TA) – formed 1939 from National Defence Companies; converted to infantry 1941 as 30th Battalion
- 6th Battalion – formed 1940, transferred to Royal Armoured Corps as 158th Regiment Royal Armoured Corps 1942; reverted to infantry as 6th Battalion 1943 and served in Burma
- 7th Battalion – converted from 50th (Holding) Battalion 1940; transferred to Royal Artillery as 90th Light Anti-Aircraft Regiment 1941 and served with 1st Division in Tunisia and Italy
- 30th Battalion (TA) – converted from 5th (HD) Battalion 1941; disbanded 1943
- 50th (Holding) Battalion – formed 1940, converted to infantry as 7th Battalion 1940
- 1st Brecknockshire Battalion, South Wales Borderers (TA) – formed as duplicate of 3rd Battalion Monmouths 1939

=== Monmouthshire Regiment ===
- 2nd Battalion, Monmouthshire Regiment (TA) – served with 53rd (Welsh) Infantry Division in North West Europe
- 3rd Battalion, Monmouthshire Regiment (TA) – served with 11th Armoured Division in North West Europe
- 4th Battalion, Monmouthshire Regiment (TA) – formed as duplicate of 2nd Battalion 1939; joined by cadre of 19 men from Cyprus and redesignated as 1st Battalion, South Wales Borderers served in UK for remainder of war

== Postwar ==
After postwar disbandments the regiment had the following battalions:

- 1st Battalion, South Wales Borderers – amalgamated with 1st Battalion Welch Regiment to form Royal Regiment of Wales (24th/41st Foot) in 1969
- 2nd Battalion, South Wales Borderers – disbanded in 1948
- Brecknockshire Battalion, South Wales Borderers – converted into 638th (Brecknock) Light Anti-Aircraft Regiment, Royal Artillery in 1947
- 2nd Battalion, Monmouthshire Regiment – became the Monmouthshire Battalion (Territorial) South Wales Borderers in the Territorial and Army Volunteer Reserve in 1967; became part of the Welsh Volunteers 1969
- 3rd (Brecknock & Monmouthshire) Battalion, Monmouthshire Regiment – converted into 637th Heavy Anti-Aircraft Regiment, Royal Artillery (3rd Bn The Monmouthshire Regiment) in 1947
