= John Norton-Griffiths =

British engineer, army officer and politician (1871–1930)

Lieutenant-Colonel Sir John Norton-Griffiths Bt
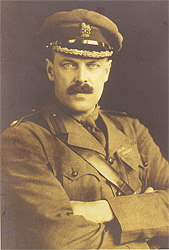
- John Norton-Griffiths
- Born: 13 July 1871; Somerset, England, UK
- Died: 27 September 1930 (aged 59) near Alexandria, Kingdom of Egypt
- Burial place: Mickleham Church, Surrey
- Military career
- Allegiance: United Kingdom
- Rank: Lieutenant Colonel
- Nickname: "Empire Jack" or "Hell-fire Jack"
- Conflicts: Second Matabele War; Second Boer War; First World War
- Awards: Knight Commander of the Order of the Bath; Distinguished Service Order
- Other work: Member of Parliament, Director of Arsenal Football Club, founding member of the Royal British Legion

Lieutenant-Colonel Sir John Norton-Griffiths, 1st Baronet, KCB, DSO (13 July 1871 – 27 September 1930) was an engineer, British Army officer during the Second Boer War and the First World War, and a Member of Parliament. A colourful figure in his day, known as "Empire Jack" or "Hellfire Jack", he was also the grandfather of Jeremy Thorpe, a leading British politician.

== Early life ==
John Norton-Griffiths was born John Griffiths in Somerset on 13 July 1871. He was the son of John Griffiths (1825–1891), a building contractor initially of Brecon, Wales (later of London), at the time of his son's birth clerk of works at St Audries Manor Estate, West Quantoxhead. He had an unsettled youth and left home at the age of 17.

After a generally wasted education he spent a year, in 1887–1888, as a trooper with the Life Guards. before travelling to the colony of Natal and shortly on to Transvaal, where he worked as a 'sub-manager' at a gold mine at the age of 17.

== Military career in Africa ==
In 1896 on the outbreak of the Second Matabele War he joined Lieut.-Colonel Edwin Alderson's Mashonaland Field Force, then in 1897 was commissioned into the British South Africa Police. In the Second Boer War, he served briefly with Brabant's Horse, then as Captain Adjutant to Lord Roberts' bodyguard.

== Marriage and family ==
In 1901, Norton-Griffiths married Gwladys, daughter of Thomas Wood, a distillery owner (Browning, Wood & Fox). Together they had four children:

- Ursula (1903–1992), who married John Thorpe, and was the mother of Jeremy Thorpe
- Peter (1905–1983), who succeeded his father as 2nd Baronet
- Phoebe (1906–1976), who married Edward Bromilow Joynson, M.B.E., of Pear Tree Cottage, Churt, Surrey
- Michael (1908–1940), Captain in the 135 Excavating Company Royal Engineers, killed in action in World War II, having married and had a daughter.

Sir John was a keen supporter of Liverpool F.C. and was a director of Arsenal F.C. between 1928 and 1930.

== Engineer and MP ==
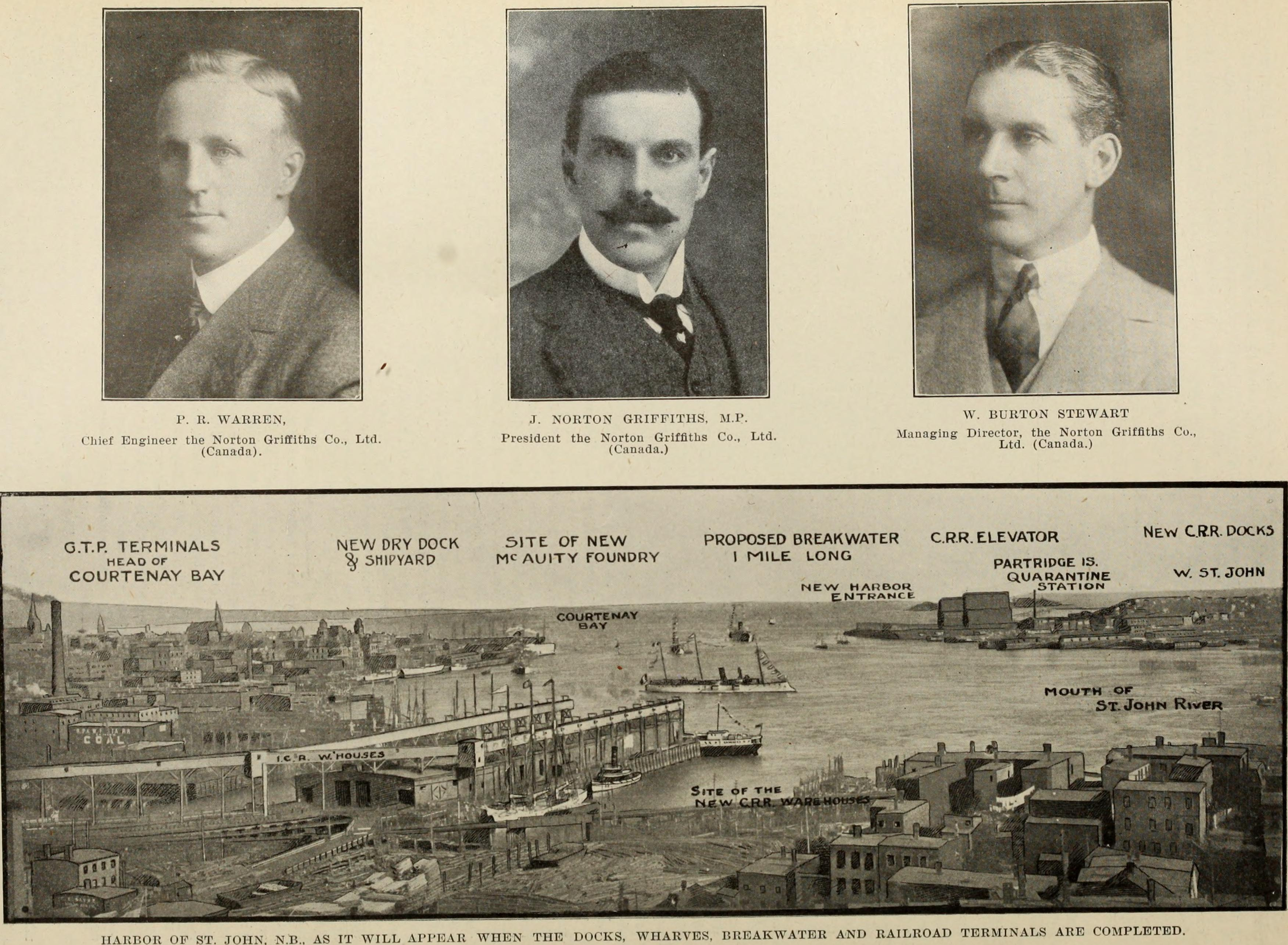
Detail for a contract to the develop the docks at Saint John, New Brunswick, in 1913. Norton-Griffiths pictured centre.

Norton-Griffiths was awarded contracts to carry out major engineering projects in Africa and South America. These included work on the first 197 km of the Benguela Railway in Angola between 1903 and 1908.

He was elected to Parliament in 1910 and was until 1918 the Conservative Party's MP for Wednesbury in Staffordshire. From 1918 until 1924 he was the Conservative MP for Wandsworth Central in London.

== First World War ==
In 1914 at the start of the First World War, Norton-Griffiths raised the 2nd King Edward's Horse at his own expense and was commissioned major in the regiment.

Using the experience from a successful engineering career, Norton-Griffiths built many fortifications for the Entente on the Western Front. During this time Norton-Griffiths took to touring the trenches in a battered Rolls-Royce loaded with crates of fine wines.

=== Tunnelling companies ===
In early December 1914, Norton-Griffiths wrote to the War Office that his tunnelling workers could be useful for the war effort, but his letter was not acted upon. However, on 20 December 1914, German sappers placed eight mines beneath the positions of an Indian Brigade in Givenchy-lès-la-Bassée. The detonation and follow-up attack led to the loss of 800 men, and following further attacks, it was evident by January 1915 that the Germans were mining to a planned system. Lord Kitchener contacted Norton-Griffiths on 12 February 1915, and by the end of the month eighteen "Manchester Moles" sewer men were in France as founding members of 170 (Tunnelling) Company, Royal Engineers.

=== Oilfield sabotage ===
In 1916, he was sent to sabotage the Romanian oil fields ahead of a German advance. Colonel Norton-Griffiths used such techniques as dumping cement down the wells, filling tanks with nails, and emptying storage wells and then setting them on fire. He was able, almost single-handedly, to destroy seventy refineries and 800,000 tons of crude oil.

General Ludendorff of the German army was later quoted as saying, "We must attribute our shortages in part to him".' German efforts later got some of the Romanian fields back online for the war effort, but they were never able to recover fully.

A more sceptical view of his activities was expressed by career diplomat Lord Hardinge of Penshurst. He wrote: "[In 1916] we had sent a special mission to Roumania under Col. Norton-Griffiths M.P. to destroy both the oil wells and the supplies of grain. Whether the mission succeeded may be judged by the fact that within six months all of the wells that had been destroyed were in working order and large supplies of oil and grain dispatched to Germany and Austria. But the head of the special mission received a K.C.B. for his efforts!".

He was awarded the Distinguished Service Order in 1916.

On becoming a Knight Commander of the Order of the Bath in 1917 he took the additional surname "Norton".

He was knighted in 1917 and promoted lieutenant colonel in 1918 (although he had temporarily also held the rank in 1916), and made a baronet in 1922.

== Last years in Egypt ==
After the First World War, his business and engineering career faltered, and his health began to deteriorate. His construction firm took on a contract to carry out the heightening of the Aswan Low Dam at an unrealistically low price. He was facing the possibility of financial ruin and perhaps even criminal prosecution.

On 27 September 1930, while in Egypt dealing with some problems which had arisen with this dam project, Sir John took a rowboat from the beach of the Casino Hotel near Alexandria, Egypt. Sometime later, the boat was found empty, and a search party was launched. They soon retrieved Sir John's body, floating in the water, with a bullet wound through the temple. No weapon was found, but the coroner's court gave a verdict of suicide. His body was brought back to England and he was buried at Mickleham, Surrey, on 18 October 1930 at the age of 59 years old.

His widow Gwladys survived him, dying in 1974 at the age of 101.

== In popular culture ==
Norton-Griffiths appears as a character in the 2021 British film, The War Below, which is a fictionalised account of the tunnelling operations prior to the Battle of Messines. He was played by Tom Goodman-Hill.

== See also ==
- Gelasio Caetani, who played a similar role in the Italian military mining service

Parliament of the United Kingdom
Preceded by Clarendon Hyde	Member of Parliament for Wednesbury; Jan. 1910–1918	Succeeded by Alfred Short
New constituency	Member of Parliament for Wandsworth Central; 1918–1924	Succeeded by Sir Henry Jackson, Bt
Baronetage of the United Kingdom
New creation	Baronet (of Wonham); 1922–1930	Succeeded by Peter Norton-Griffiths
