= 250th Tunnelling Company =

Tunnelling company of the Royal Engineers of the British Army in World War I

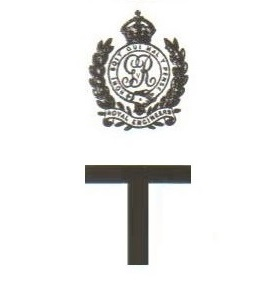
- Active: World War I
- Country: United Kingdom
- Branch: British Army
- Type: Royal Engineer tunnelling company
- Role: military engineering, tunnel warfare
- Nickname: "The Moles"
- Engagements: World War I Battle of Messines

Commanders
- Notable commanders: Cecil Cropper

The 250th Tunnelling Company was one of the tunnelling companies of the Royal Engineers created by the British Army during World War I. The tunnelling units were occupied in offensive and defensive mining involving the placing and maintaining of mines under enemy lines, as well as other underground work such as the construction of deep dugouts for troop accommodation, the digging of subways, saps (a narrow trench dug to approach enemy trenches), cable trenches and underground chambers for signals and medical services.

== Background ==
By January 1915, it had become evident to the BEF at the Western Front that the Germans were mining to a planned system. As the British had failed to develop suitable counter-tactics or underground listening devices before the war, field marshals French and Kitchener agreed to investigate the suitability of forming British mining units. Following consultations between the Engineer-in-Chief of the BEF, Brigadier George Fowke, and the mining specialist John Norton-Griffiths, the War Office formally approved the tunnelling company scheme on 19 February 1915.

Norton-Griffiths ensured that tunnelling companies numbers 170 to 177 were ready for deployment in mid-February 1915. In the spring of that year, there was constant underground fighting in the Ypres Salient at Hooge, Hill 60, Railway Wood, Sanctuary Wood, St Eloi and The Bluff which required the deployment of new drafts of tunnellers for several months after the formation of the first eight companies. The lack of suitably experienced men led to some tunnelling companies starting work later than others. The number of units available to the BEF was also restricted by the need to provide effective counter-measures to the German mining activities. To make the tunnels safer and quicker to deploy, the British Army enlisted experienced coal miners, many outside their nominal recruitment policy. The first nine companies, numbers 170 to 178, were each commanded by a regular Royal Engineers officer. These companies each comprised 5 officers and 269 sappers; they were aided by additional infantrymen who were temporarily attached to the tunnellers as required, which almost doubled their numbers. The success of the first tunnelling companies formed under Norton-Griffiths' command led to mining being made a separate branch of the Engineer-in-Chief's office under Major-General S.R. Rice, and the appointment of an 'Inspector of Mines' at the GHQ Saint-Omer office of the Engineer-in-Chief. A second group of tunnelling companies were formed from Welsh miners from the 1st and 3rd Battalions of the Monmouthshire Regiment, who were attached to the 1st Northumberland Field Company of the Royal Engineers, which was a Territorial unit. The formation of twelve new tunnelling companies, between July and October 1915, helped to bring more men into action in other parts of the Western Front.

Most tunnelling companies were formed under Norton-Griffiths' leadership during 1915, and one more was added in 1916. On 10 September 1915, the British government sent an appeal to Canada, South Africa, Australia and New Zealand to raise tunnelling companies in the Dominions of the British Empire. On 17 September, New Zealand became the first Dominion to agree the formation of a tunnelling unit. The New Zealand Tunnelling Company arrived at Plymouth on 3 February 1916 and was deployed to the Western Front in northern France. A Canadian unit was formed from men on the battlefield, plus two other companies trained in Canada and then shipped to France. Three Australian tunnelling companies were formed by March 1916, resulting in 30 tunnelling companies of the Royal Engineers being available by the summer of 1916.

== Unit history ==
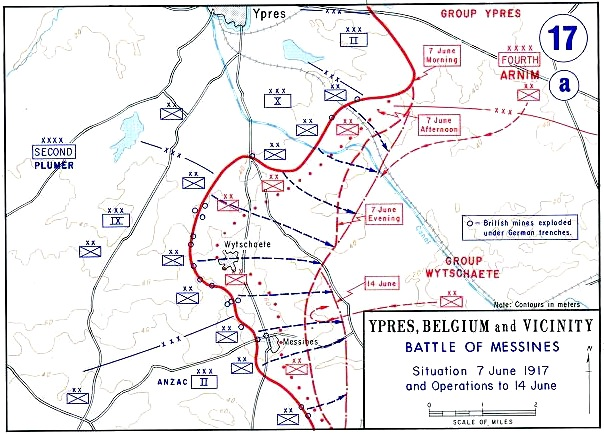
Map of the mines laid before the Battle of Messines, 1917

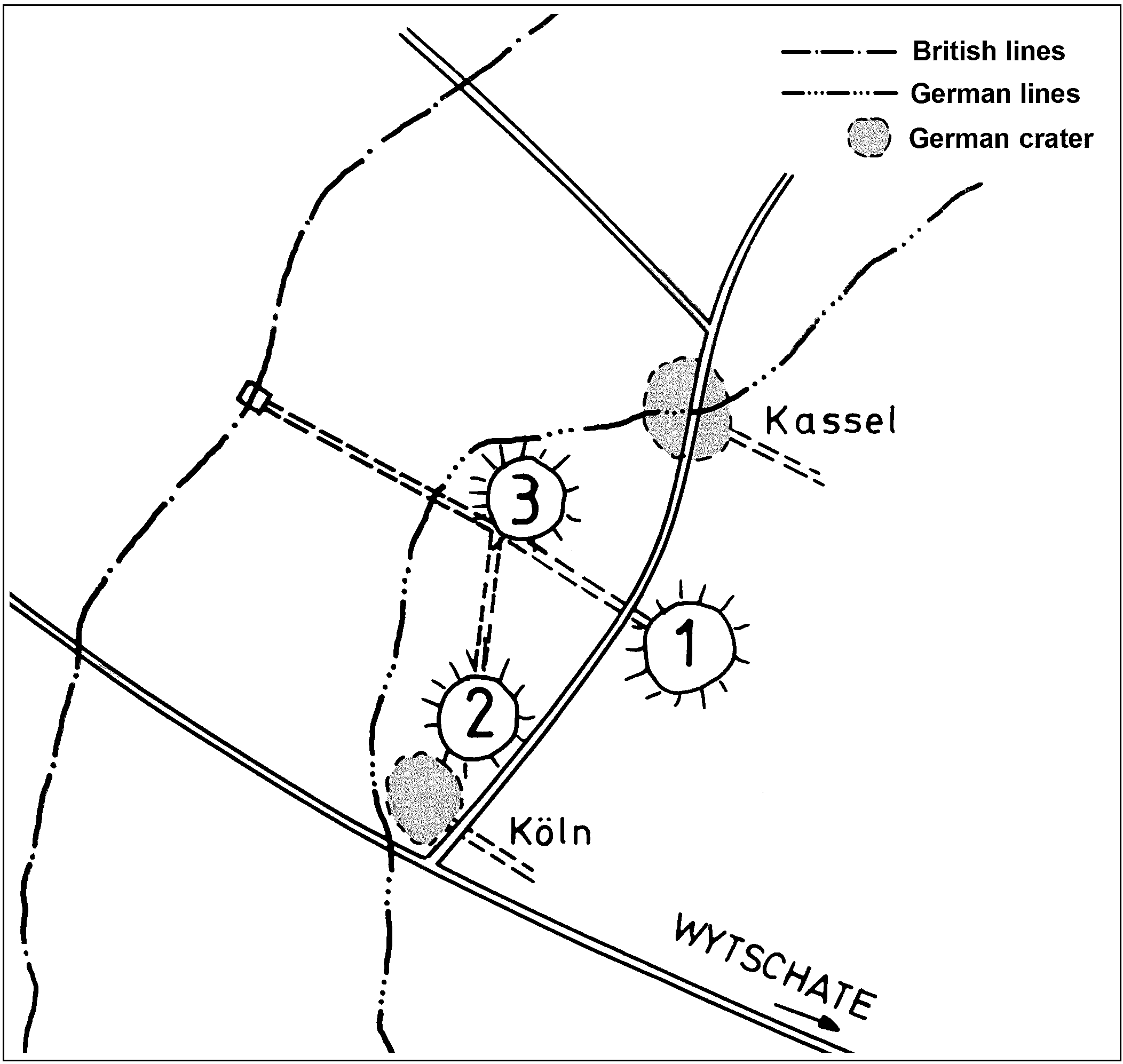
Plan for the British deep mine at Hollandscheschur Farm with its three chambers

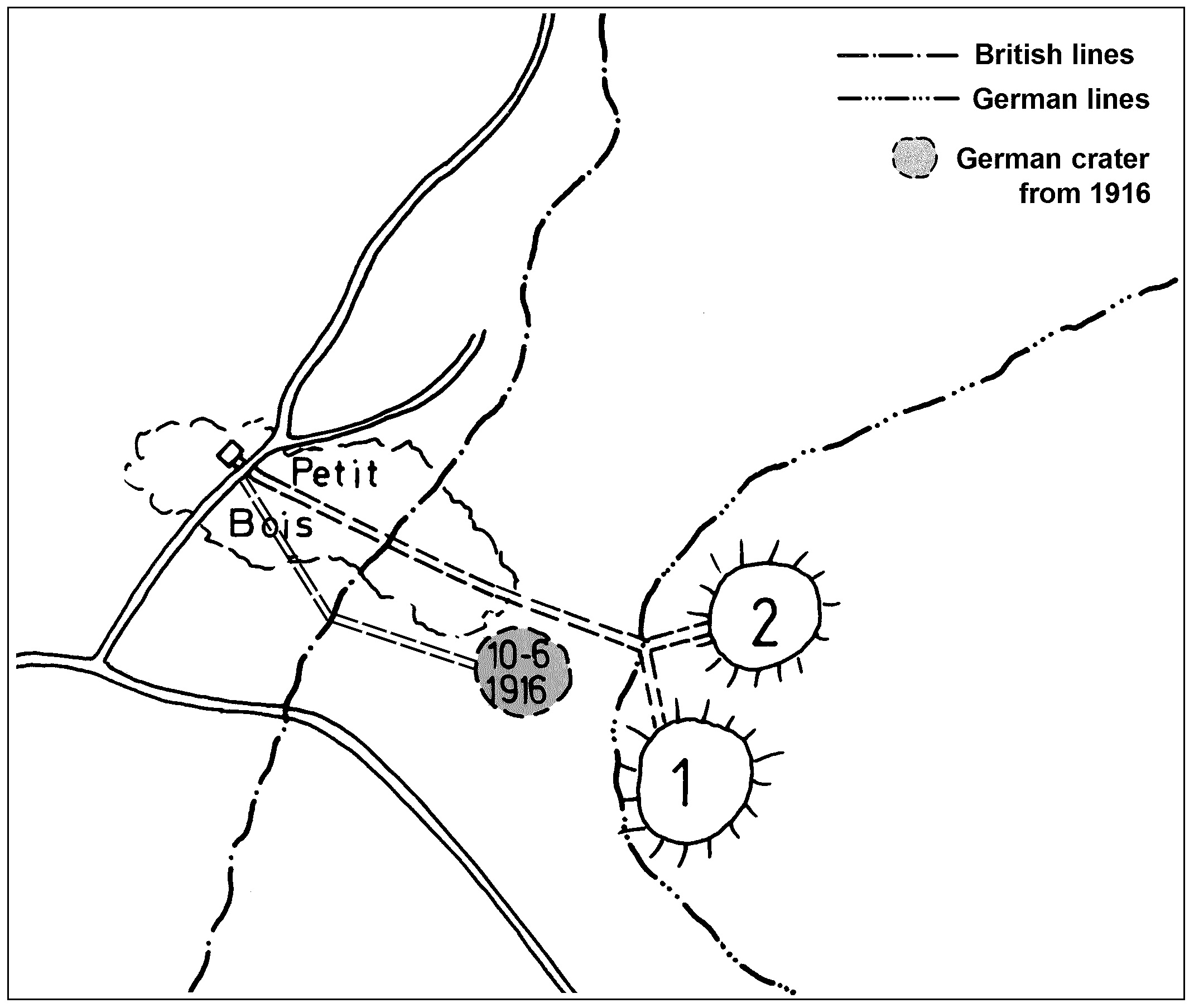
Plan for the British deep mine at Petit Bois with its two chambers and the crater of the German counter mine of 1916 clearly visible

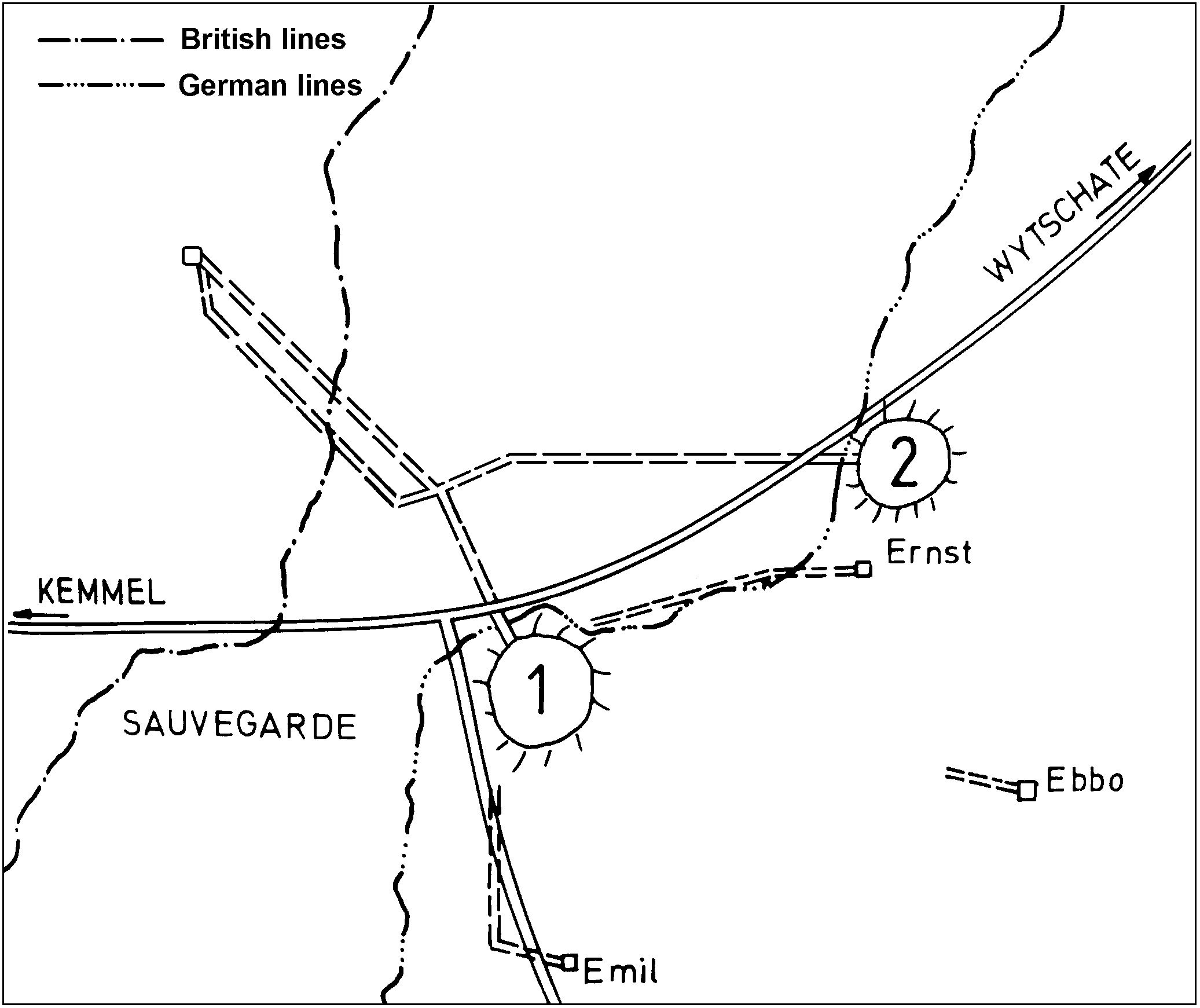
Plan for the British deep mine at Peckham Farm

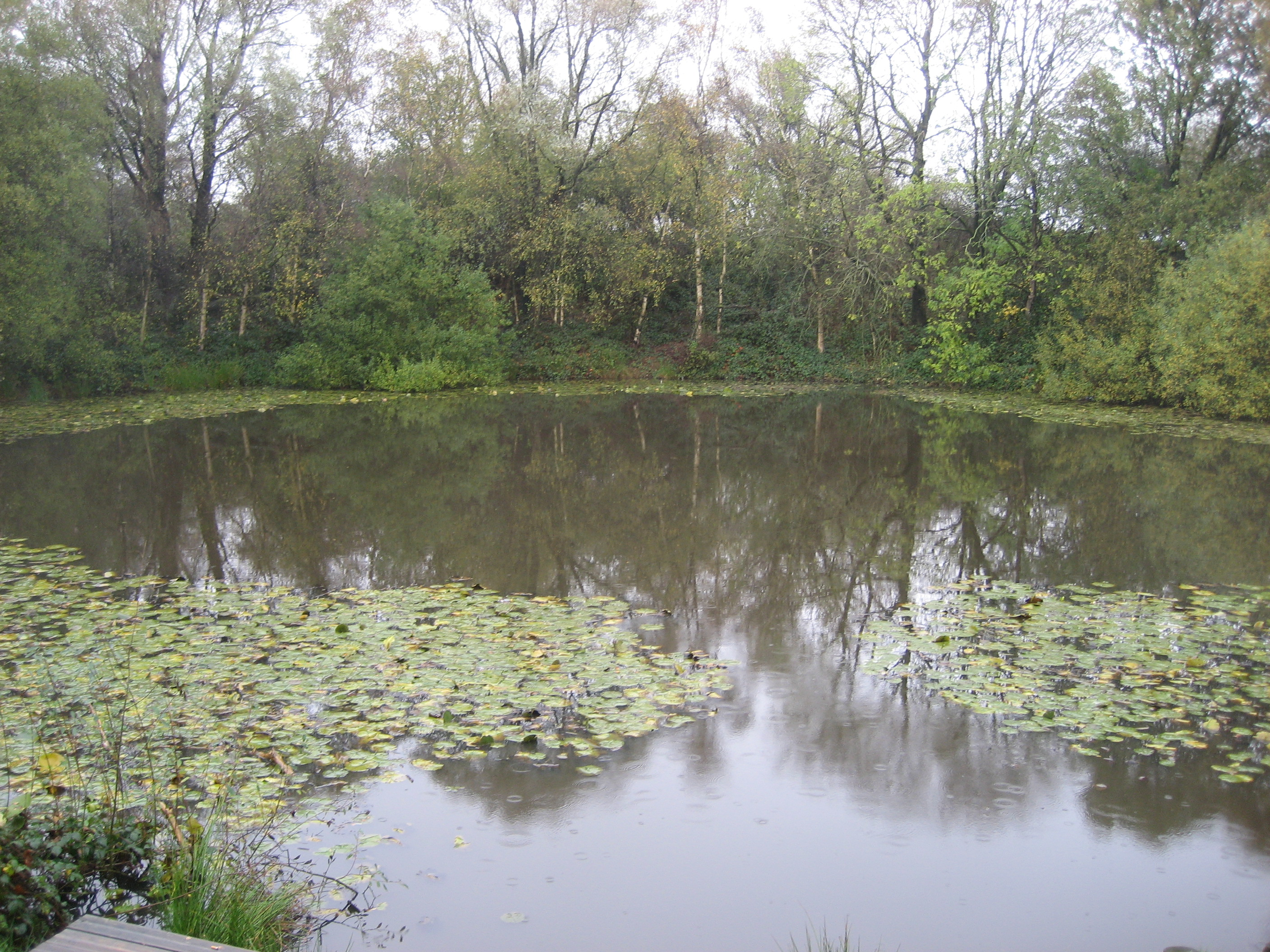
Spanbroekmolen crater in November 2009. It was created in 1917 by one of the mines in the Battle of Messines. It is also known as "Lone Tree Crater" or "Pool of Peace".

250th Tunnelling Company was formed in Rouen in October 1915. It was then moved into the Ypres Salient, where it relieved 177th Tunnelling Company, which at that time was stationed in a wide area facing Wijtschate. From May 1916 until December 1918 the company served under Reserve (later Fifth) Army.

=== Messines 1916/17 ===
As part of the prelude to the Battle of Messines, deep-level mine galleries were dug by the British 171st, 175th and 250th Tunnelling companies and the 1st Canadian, 3rd Canadian and 1st Australian Tunnelling companies, while the British 183rd, 2nd Canadian and 2nd Australian Tunnelling companies built dugouts (underground shelters) in the Second Army area. 250th Tunnelling Company's role prior to the Battle of Messines was to dig the mines at Petit Bois, Peckham and Spanbroekmolen under the Messines ridge. The mines at Messines were detonated on 7 June 1917, creating 19 large craters.

In November 1915, 250th Tunnelling Company began work on the deep mine at Hollandscheschur Farm as it sank a shaft to some 20 metres (66 ft) and then drove a tunnel over 250 metres (820 ft) extending well behind the German lines. Despite counter-mining by German units, three charges were eventually placed and fired. The mine consisted of three chambers (Hollandscheschur Farm 1, 2, 3) with a shared gallery. It was placed around the German strongpoint Günther between Wijtschate and Voormezele, not far from the Bayernwald trenches in Croonaert Wood. The logic behind the exact placing of the charges at Hollandscheschur Farm was to take out a small German salient (strongpoint Günther) that protruded into the British lines.

In December 1915, 250th Tunnelling Company began work on the deep mine at Petit Bois. The mine consisted of two chambers (Petit Bois 1, 2) with a shared gallery. Tunnelling began about 170 m behind the British forward lines and first went down over 30 metres (98 ft). As with many deep mines, compressed air and electricity were supplied from the surface. The tunnellers experimented with a mechanical excavator operated by hydraulic rams, similar to those used for the London Underground. The device weighed more than half a ton and promised to cut a tunnel about 2 metres (6.6 ft) in diameter. In March 1916 it was used to dig 5 metres (16 ft) but developed difficulties and was abandoned in situ. The main gallery of the Petit Bois mine was taken out by clay kicking over 500 metres (1,600 ft) and reached beyond the German lines when it was breached by enemy counter-mining. When the enemy blew a camouflet in June, 12 men were trapped by a collapsed tunnel over 30 metres (98 ft) below the surface. After six days, the British tunnellers managed to rescue Sapper Bedson, a veteran of the Ypres Salient and of Gallipoli. When after six and a half days he was rescued, his first words were: “For God’s sake give me a drink! It’s been a damned long shift!” When completed, the main gallery leading to the two mine chambers was more than 600 metres (2,000 ft) long.

On 18 December 1915, the 250th Tunnelling Company began work on the deep mine at Peckham Farm. It consisted of two chambers (Peckham 1, 2) with a shared gallery. The shaft was sunk to 20 metres (66 ft), the heavy clay requiring much timber as the tunnel was driven forward to the German lines. Despite strenuous efforts to work as silently as possible, including the use of the 'clay kicking' method, German trench mortar activity caused many delays and flooding swamped much of the work, causing several earlier tunnels to be abandoned. The main charge was eventually placed below Peckham Farm as planned and in time, some 400 metres (1,300 ft) from where the digging had started. Peckham 2 was placed under a farm building but abandoned after the tunnel flooded. Peckham 1 was detonated on 7 June 1917.

250th Tunnelling Company also started the deep mine under the German positions at Spanbroekmolen. This mine was named after a windmill that stood on the site for three centuries until it was destroyed by the Germans on 1 November 1914. In order to start a mine gallery, the tunnellers looked for some cover under which to dig a vertical shaft from which the tunnel could be driven forward towards the enemy lines. At Spanbroekmolen, the start point for the tunnel was in the area of a small wood some 270 metres (300 yd) to the south-west. In December 1915, 250th Tunnelling Company dug a 18 metres (60 ft) shaft and then handed over the work to 3rd Canadian Tunnelling Company in January 1916.

Two shafts were sunk by 250th Tunnelling Company late in 1916 from Maedelstede Farm. They ran two long drives parallel for about 200 metres (670 ft) then branched: one to place a mine 790 metres (2,600 ft) away in the Bois de Wytschaete, the other beneath the front line. The Germans blew several heavy camouflets in the area and work was delayed as the miners had to be withdrawn from the tunnel regularly. The first gallery was driven 490 metres (1,600 ft) but was halted when it became clear that it would not reach its objective in time. The second gallery was only completed on 6 June 1917, one day before the attack.

250th Tunnelling Company carried out the preparations for digging the deep mines at Kruisstraat, which were begun in December 1915, handed over to 182nd Tunnelling Company at the beginning of January 1916, and to 3rd Canadian Tunnelling Company at the end of the month.

== See also ==
- Mine warfare

== Bibliography ==
- Edmonds, J. E. (1991) [1948]. Military Operations France and Belgium, 1917: 7 June – 10 November: Messines and Third Ypres (Passchendaele). History of the Great War Based on Official Documents by Direction of the Historical Section of the Committee of Imperial Defence. Vol. II (Imperial War Museum and Battery Press ed.). London: HMSO. ISBN 0-89839-166-0.
- Holt, Tonie; Holt, Valmai (2014) [1997]. Major & Mrs Holt's Battlefield Guide to the Ypres Salient & Passchendaele. Barnsley: Pen & Sword Books. ISBN 978-0-85052-551-9.
- Jones, Simon (2010). Underground Warfare 1914–1918. Pen & Sword Military. ISBN 978-1-84415-962-8.
- Tweedie, Neil (12 January 2004). "Farmer who is sitting on a bomb". The Daily Telegraph. ISSN 0307-1235.
