= Samuel Glode =

Mi'kmaq guide and soldier (1880–1957)

Samuel Glode (also Gloade; 20 April 1877 – 26 October 1957) was a Canadian Mi'kmaq guide who served in the First World War.

Samuel Glode was born 20 April 1877, son of Stephen Glode and Sarah Jane Labrador of Shelburne, Nova Scotia.

Glode first worked as a lumberjack and later as a guide. He was a single father, his wife Louisa Francis having died in 1905. He enlisted in the Canadian Expeditionary Force in 1915. Deployed to England for training in 1916, Glode volunteered to transfer to the Canadian Engineers as part of the No. 1 Canadian Tunnelling Company. He participated in tunnelling operations during the battles of Messines, Passchendaele and Vimy Ridge.

In 1918 Glode was posted to the 6th Battalion Canadian Engineers and promoted to corporal. He was awarded the Distinguished Conduct Medal for his work removing 450 demolition charges during the advance toward Germany. This made him one of the most highly decorated First Nations combatants of the war.

He returned to Nova Scotia after the war and died at Camp Hill Hospital in 1957.
