= 3rd Canadian Tunnelling Company =

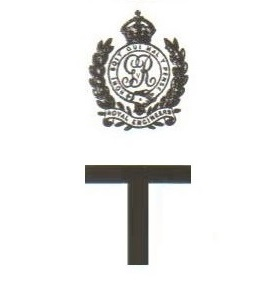
- Active: World War I
- Country: Canada
- Branch: Canadian Expeditionary Force
- Type: Royal Engineer tunnelling company
- Role: Military engineering Tunnel warfare
- Nickname: "The Beavers"
- Engagements: World War I Hill 60; Battle of Messines

The 3rd Canadian Tunnelling Company was one of the tunnelling companies of the Canadian Military Engineers during World War I. The tunnelling units were occupied in offensive and defensive mining involving the placing and maintaining of mines under enemy lines, as well as other underground work such as the construction of deep dugouts for troop accommodation, the digging of subways, saps (a narrow trench dug to approach enemy trenches), cable trenches and underground chambers for signals and medical services.

== Background ==
By January 1915 it had become evident to the BEF at the Western Front that the Germans were mining to a planned system. As the British had failed to develop suitable counter-tactics or underground listening devices before the war, field marshals French and Kitchener agreed to investigate the suitability of forming British mining units. Following consultations between the Engineer-in-Chief of the BEF, Brigadier George Fowke, and the mining specialist John Norton-Griffiths, the War Office formally approved the tunnelling company scheme on 19 February 1915.

Norton-Griffiths ensured that tunnelling companies numbers 170 to 177 were ready for deployment in mid-February 1915. In the spring of that year, there was constant underground fighting in the Ypres Salient at Hooge, Hill 60, Railway Wood, Sanctuary Wood, St Eloi and The Bluff which required the deployment of new drafts of tunnellers for several months after the formation of the first eight companies. The lack of suitably experienced men led to some tunnelling companies starting work later than others. The number of units available to the BEF was also restricted by the need to provide effective counter-measures to the German mining activities. To make the tunnels safer and quicker to deploy, the British Army enlisted experienced coal miners, many outside their nominal recruitment policy. The first nine companies, numbers 170 to 178, were each commanded by a regular Royal Engineers officer. These companies each comprised 5 officers and 269 sappers; they were aided by additional infantrymen who were temporarily attached to the tunnellers as required, which almost doubled their numbers. The success of the first tunnelling companies formed under Norton-Griffiths' command led to mining being made a separate branch of the Engineer-in-Chief's office under Major-General S.R. Rice, and the appointment of an 'Inspector of Mines' at the GHQ Saint-Omer office of the Engineer-in-Chief. A second group of tunnelling companies were formed from Welsh miners from the 1st and 3rd Battalions of the Monmouthshire Regiment, who were attached to the 1st Northumberland Field Company of the Royal Engineers, which was a Territorial unit. The formation of twelve new tunnelling companies, between July and October 1915, helped to bring more men into action in other parts of the Western Front. Most British tunnelling companies were formed under Norton-Griffiths' leadership during 1915, and one more was added in 1916.

On 10 September 1915, the British government sent an appeal to Canada, South Africa, Australia and New Zealand to raise tunnelling companies in the Dominions of the British Empire. On 17 September, New Zealand became the first Dominion to agree the formation of a tunnelling unit. The New Zealand Tunnelling Company arrived at Plymouth on 3 February 1916 and was deployed to the Western Front in northern France. The Canadian Military Engineers contributed three tunnelling companies to the British Expeditionary Force. One unit was formed from men on the battlefield, plus two other companies trained in Canada and then shipped to France. Three Australian tunnelling companies were formed by March 1916, resulting in 30 tunnelling companies of the Royal Engineers being available by the summer of 1916.

== Unit history ==
3rd Canadian Tunnelling Company was established at St Marie Cappel in January 1916 when the original Canadian mining sections operating as part of 1st and 2nd Canadian Division were withdrawn from their positions south of Ypres, and were reformed into this new company.

=== Messines 1916/17 ===
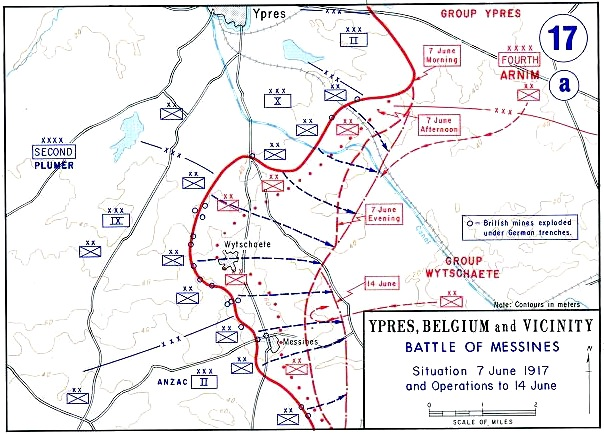
Map of the mines laid before the Battle of Messines, 1917

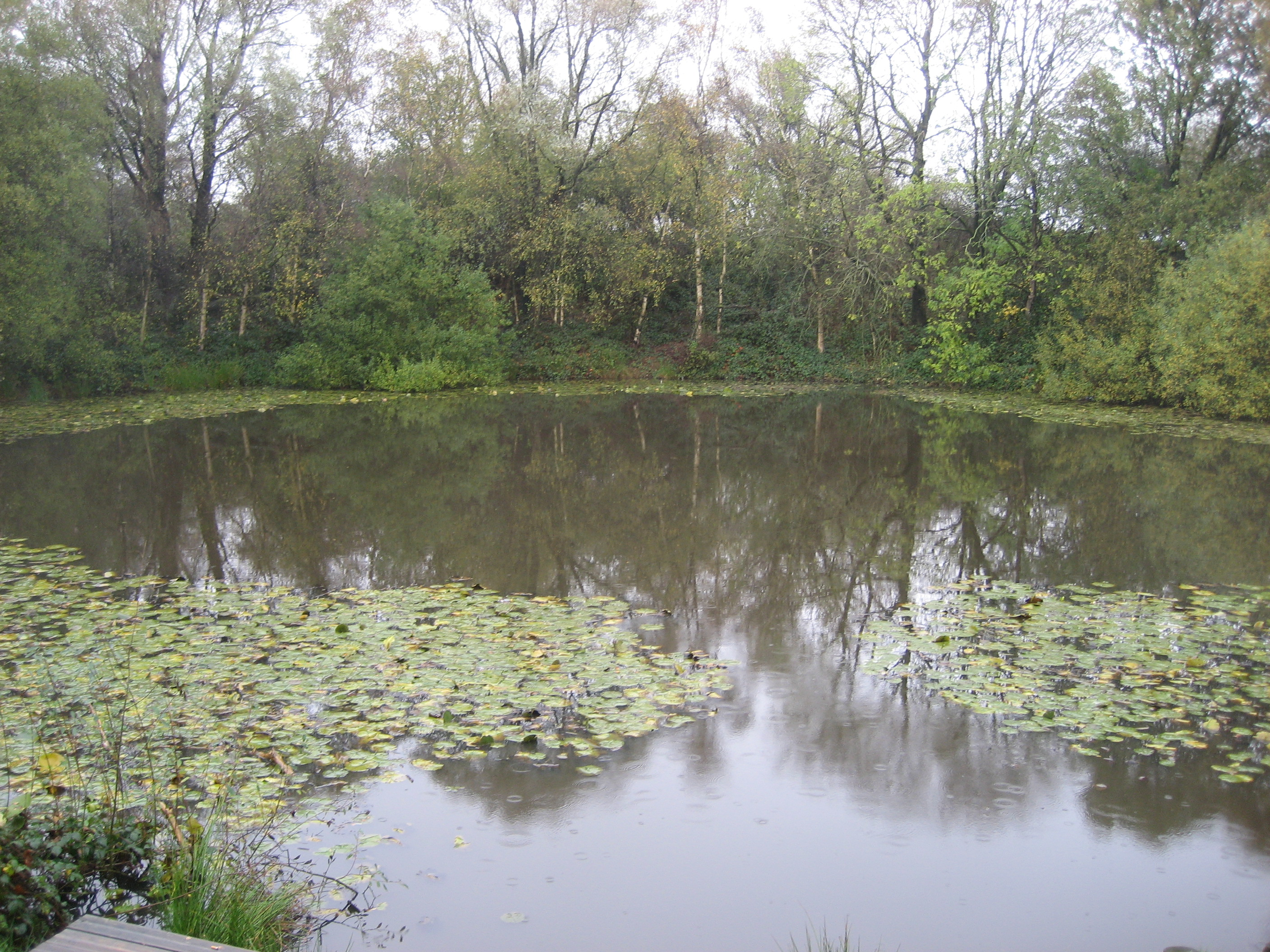
Spanbroekmolen crater in November 2009. It was created in 1917 by one of the mines in the Battle of Messines. It is also known as "Lone Tree Crater" or "Pool of Peace".

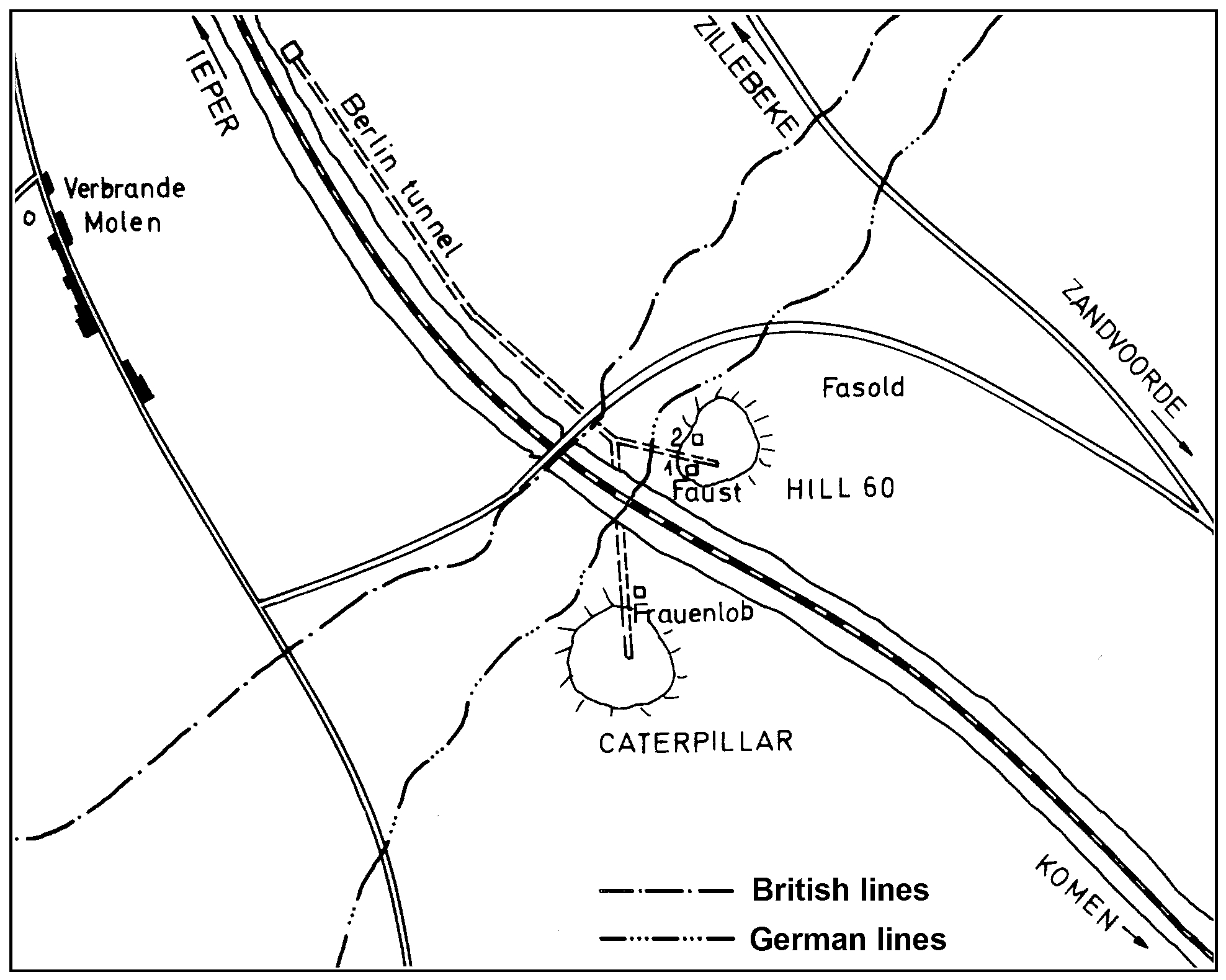
Plan of the two deep mines placed at Hill 60 before the Battle of Messines

As part of the preparations for the Battle of Messines, the 3rd Canadian Tunnelling Company began work at Spanbroekmolen and other places facing the Messines ridge. These activities formed part of the mines that were dug by the British 171st, 175th, 250th, 1st Canadian, 3rd Canadian and 1st Australian Tunnelling companies as part of the prelude to the Battle of Messines (7–14 June 1917), while the British 183rd, 2nd Canadian and 2nd Australian Tunnelling companies built deep dugouts (underground shelters) in the Second Army area.

In January 1916, 3rd Canadian Tunnelling Company took over work on the Spanbroekmolen mine from the 250th Tunnelling Company which had already dug a 18 metres (60 ft) shaft there, and handed Spanbroekmolen over to the 171st Tunnelling Company in April 1916. By the end of January 1916, 3rd Canadian Tunnelling Company also took over digging deep mines at Kruisstraat from 182nd Tunnelling Company. In April 1916, work at Kruisstraat was passed on to 175th Tunnelling Company.

3rd Canadian Tunnelling Company worked at The Bluff in early 1916 and Hill 60 during summer 1916. Deep mining under the German galleries beneath Hill 60 had begun in late August 1915 with the 175th Tunnelling Company which had started a gallery 200 metres (220 yd) behind the British front line and passed 27 metres (90 ft) beneath the German positions. The British underground works consisted of an access gallery (nicknamed Berlin Tunnel) leading to two mine chambers called Hill 60 A (beneath Hill 60) and Hill 60 B (beneath The Caterpillar). The 3rd Canadian Tunnelling Company took over in April 1916 and completed the galleries, Hill 60 A being charged with explosives in July 1916 and the Hill 60 B branch gallery in October. By October 1916, Hill 60 A had been charged with 24,200 kilograms (53,300 lb) of explosives and Hill 60 B with 32,000 kilograms (70,000 lb) of high explosive, despite water-logging and the demolition by a camouflet of 61 metres (200 ft) of German gallery above the British diggings, which endangered the British deep mines. 1st Australian Tunnelling Company took over in November 1916 and maintained the completed mines beneath Hill 60 and The Caterpillar over the winter and months of underground fighting until June 1917, when they were fired at the beginning of the Battle of Messines.

3rd Canadian Tunnelling Company meanwhile took over the tunnelling operations at the southern end of the Messines ridge, continuing work already begun on the forked tunnels at Trench 127, Trench 122 (Ultimo and Factory Farm) and Birdcage close to Ploegsteert Wood. Although it was eventually decided not to detonate the mines at the Birdcage position, the 3rd Canadian Tunnelling Company successfully ignited their other mines at the appointed time. When the mines at Messines were detonated on 7 June 1917, they created 19 large craters.

=== Spring Offensive ===
After the German spring offensive in April 1918, when the enemy broke through the Lys positions, the 3rd Canadian Tunnelling Company were put on duties that included digging and wiring trenches over a long distance from Reningelst to near Saint-Omer. The operation to construct these fortifications between Reningelst and Saint-Omer was carried out jointly by the British 171st, 173rd, 183rd, 184th, 255th, 258th, 3rd Canadian and 3rd Australian Tunnelling Companies.

=== Armistice ===
After the Armistice, the 3rd Canadian Tunnelling Company repaired the town waterworks at Roubaix.

== See also ==
- Mine warfare
