= 1st Canadian Tunnelling Company =

Military unit

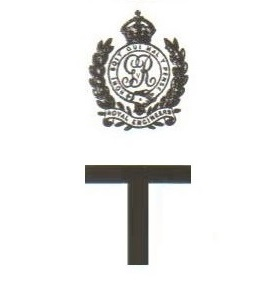
- Active: World War I
- Country: Canada
- Branch: Canadian Expeditionary Force
- Type: Royal Engineer tunnelling company
- Role: Military engineering Tunnel warfare
- Nickname: "The Beavers"
- Engagements: World War I Battle of Messines

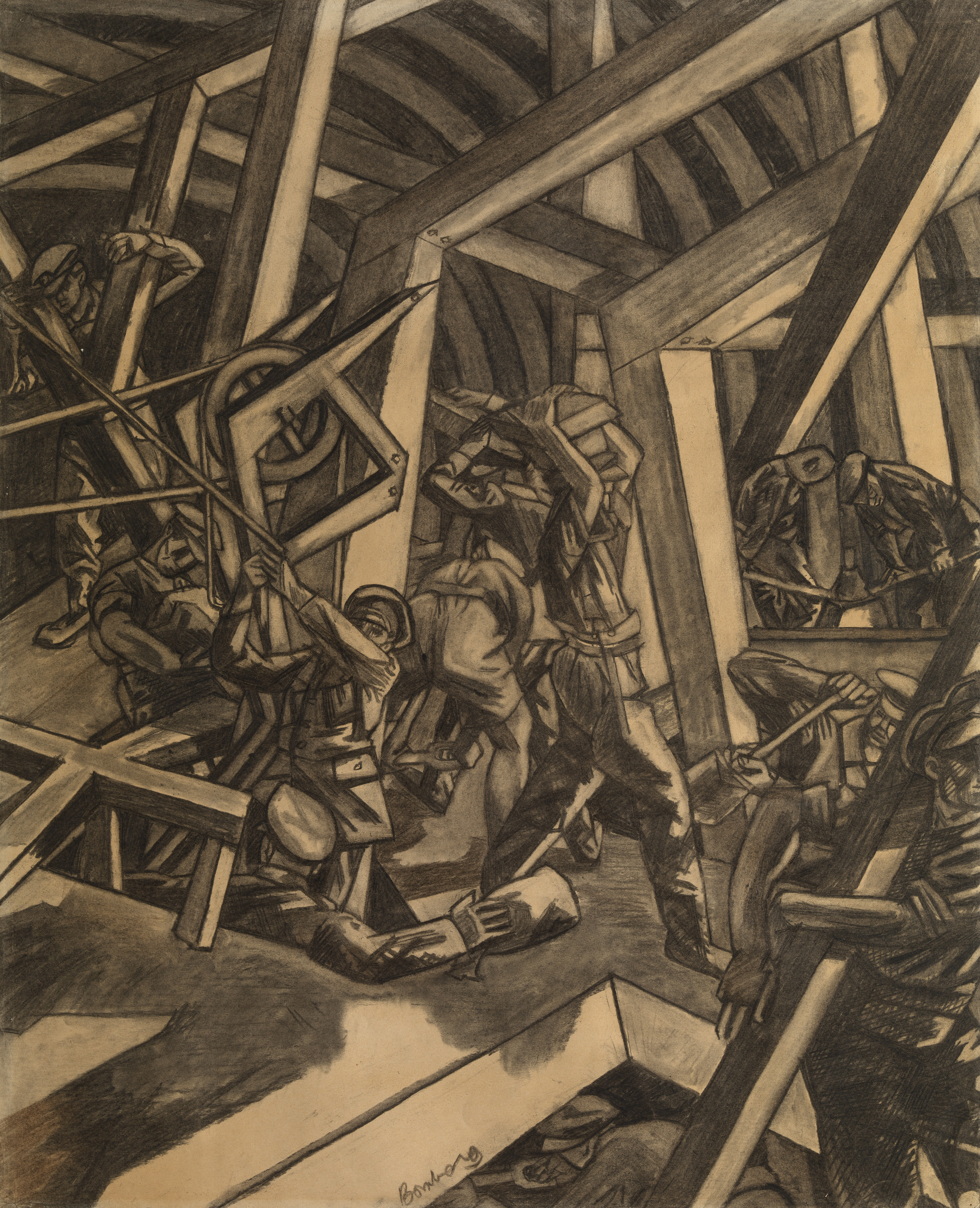
Sappers at Work: A Canadian Tunnelling Company, Hill 60, St Eloi by David Bomberg, which bears a reference to 1st Canadian Tunnelling Company.

The 1st Canadian Tunnelling Company was one of the tunnelling companies of the Canadian Military Engineers during World War I. The tunnelling units were occupied in offensive and defensive mining involving the placing and maintaining of mines under enemy lines, as well as other underground work such as the construction of deep dugouts for troop accommodation, the digging of subways, saps (a narrow trench dug to approach enemy trenches), cable trenches and underground chambers for signals and medical services.

== Background ==
By January 1915 it had become evident to the BEF at the Western Front that the Germans were mining to a planned system. As the British had failed to develop suitable counter-tactics or underground listening devices before the war, field marshals French and Kitchener agreed to investigate the suitability of forming British mining units. Following consultations between the Engineer-in-Chief of the BEF, Brigadier George Fowke, and the mining specialist John Norton-Griffiths, the War Office formally approved the tunnelling company scheme on 19 February 1915.

Norton-Griffiths ensured that tunnelling companies numbers 170 to 177 were ready for deployment in mid-February 1915. In the spring of that year, there was constant underground fighting in the Ypres Salient at Hooge, Hill 60, Railway Wood, Sanctuary Wood, St Eloi and The Bluff which required the deployment of new drafts of tunnellers for several months after the formation of the first eight companies. The lack of suitably experienced men led to some tunnelling companies starting work later than others. The number of units available to the BEF was also restricted by the need to provide effective counter-measures to the German mining activities. To make the tunnels safer and quicker to deploy, the British Army enlisted experienced coal miners, many outside their nominal recruitment policy. The first nine companies, numbers 170 to 178, were each commanded by a regular Royal Engineers officer. These companies each comprised 5 officers and 269 sappers; they were aided by additional infantrymen who were temporarily attached to the tunnellers as required, which almost doubled their numbers. The success of the first tunnelling companies formed under Norton-Griffiths' command led to mining being made a separate branch of the Engineer-in-Chief's office under Major-General S.R. Rice, and the appointment of an 'Inspector of Mines' at the GHQ Saint-Omer office of the Engineer-in-Chief. A second group of tunnelling companies were formed from Welsh miners from the 1st and 3rd Battalions of the Monmouthshire Regiment, who were attached to the 1st Northumberland Field Company of the Royal Engineers, which was a Territorial unit. The formation of twelve new tunnelling companies, between July and October 1915, helped to bring more men into action in other parts of the Western Front. Most British tunnelling companies were formed under Norton-Griffiths' leadership during 1915, and one more was added in 1916.

On 10 September 1915, the British government sent an appeal to Canada, South Africa, Australia and New Zealand to raise tunnelling companies in the Dominions of the British Empire. On 17 September, New Zealand became the first Dominion to agree the formation of a tunnelling unit. The New Zealand Tunnelling Company arrived at Plymouth on 3 February 1916 and was deployed to the Western Front in northern France. The Canadian Military Engineers contributed three tunnelling companies to the British Expeditionary Force. One unit was formed from men on the battlefield, plus two other companies trained in Canada and then shipped to France. Three Australian tunnelling companies were formed by March 1916, resulting in 30 tunnelling companies of the Royal Engineers being available by the summer of 1916.

== Unit history ==
The unit patch of the 1st Canadian Tunnelling Company was a red square with a large black capital letter T on it.

=== Formation, Armentières, The Bluff ===
1st Canadian Tunnelling Company was formed in eastern Canada, then moved to France and into the Ypres Salient for instruction in early 1916. Shortly afterwards, in March 1916, it relieved 182nd Tunnelling Company near Armentières. 1st Canadian Tunnelling Company then moved to The Bluff in May 1916, where ít worked on tunnels until January 1917 when it was relieved by 2nd Australian Tunnelling Company. From spring 1916 onwards, the Germans drove long galleries beneath The Bluff, and on 25 July 1916 the 1st Company of the 24th Pioneers blew a mine under the ridge. The 1st Canadian Tunnelling Company had, however, anticipated the blow so casualties were minimized and the attacking German infantry did not capture the ridge.

=== Hill 60/Messines ===
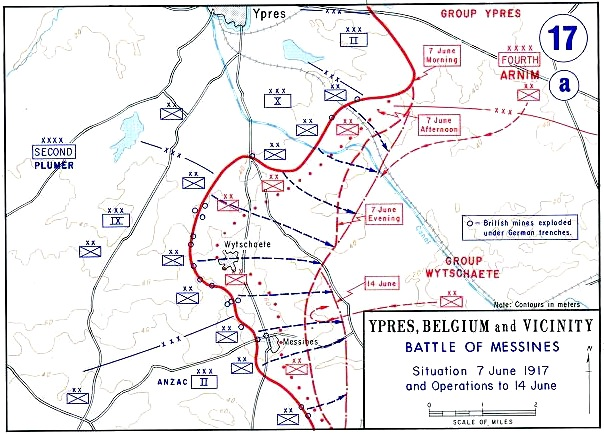
Map of the mines laid before the Battle of Messines, 1917

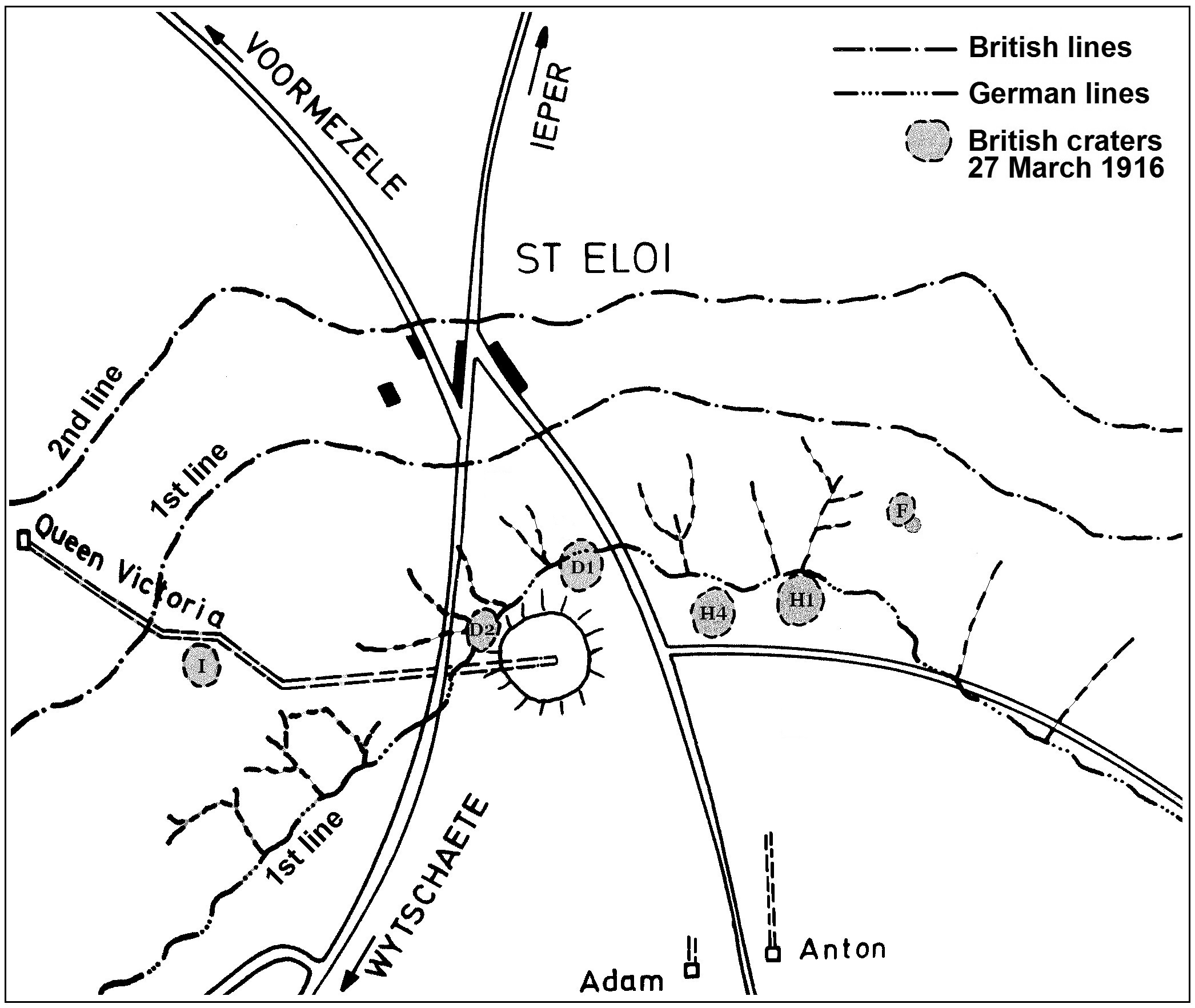
Plan of the deep mine dug from the "Queen Victoria" gallery and placed by the 1st Canadian Tunnelling Company at St Eloi before the Battle of Messines

1st Canadian Tunnelling Company next took over the tunnelling operations at Hill 60 in preparation for the Battle of Messines (7–14 June 1917). In November 1916 the unit handed the operation at Hill 60 over to the 1st Australian Tunnelling Company and moved to St Eloi where it took over from 172nd Tunnelling Company and continued driving the tunnel system beneath enemy lines. The deep mine at St Eloi was the largest of the mines in the Battle of Messines. The work was begun with a deep shaft named Queen Victoria and the chamber was set 42 metres (138 ft) below ground, at the end of a gallery 408 metres (1,339 ft) long and charged with 43,400 kilograms (95,600 lb) of ammonal. Building preparations had started on 16 August 1915 and the mine was completed on 11 June 1916. The mines to be fired at the start of the Battle of Messines were dug by the British 171st, 175th, 250th, 1st Canadian, 3rd Canadian and 1st Australian Tunnelling companies as part of the prelude to the Battle of Messines, while the British 183rd, 2nd Canadian and 2nd Australian Tunnelling companies built underground shelters in the Second Army area. 1st Canadian Tunnelling Company saw the tunnelling operations at St Eloi through to 1917 and successfully fired the mine on 7 June 1917. When the mines at Messines were detonated, they created 19 large craters. The joint explosion of these mines ranks among the largest non-nuclear explosions of all time. When the St Eloi deep mine was fired, it destroyed some of the earlier craters (code-named D2 and D1) which had been created in 1916 by the 172nd Tunnelling Company, although a double crater (H4 and H1) can still be seen (see image). The successful detonation allowed the capture of the German lines at St Eloi by the British 41st Division.

The 1st Canadian Tunnelling Company used a Whittaker tunnel boring machine for their workings at the Lock Hospital position in 1917, this tunnel was handed over to the 2nd Australian Tunnelling Company on 10 May 1917. The tunnelling by machine in the Belgian blue clay was problematic and the War Diary lists numerous stoppages for repairs. The Lock Hospital position was at Lock 6 on the Ypres–Comines canal, and the tunnel extended from there to a point beneath the British lines some 400 metres away. The final approach gallery beneath no-man's land to the German trenches was to be completed by the silent clay-kicking method. In the end, problems with the machinery and the geology led to this project being abandoned.

In October 1918, 1st Canadian Tunnelling Company fought with the 4th Canadian Division in operations to prevent the demolition of bridges on the Canal de L'Escaut, north-east of Cambrai, during which Captain Coulson Norman Mitchell earned the Victoria Cross.

== Notable members ==
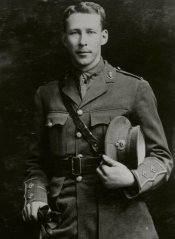
Captain Coulson Norman Mitchell VC

- Captain Coulson Norman Mitchell VC MC (1889–1978). As an officer with the 1st Canadian Tunnelling Company he was awarded the Military Cross in 1917, and went on to win the Victoria Cross for preventing the demolition of bridges on the Canal de L'Escaut, north-east of Cambrai on 8–9 October 1918. His medal is held by the Canadian Military Engineers Museum, CFB Gagetown, New Brunswick.

== Popular culture ==
- During the war, David Bomberg painted Sappers at Work: A Canadian Tunnelling Company, Hill 60, St Eloi.

== See also ==
- Mine warfare
