= 2nd Australian Tunnelling Company =

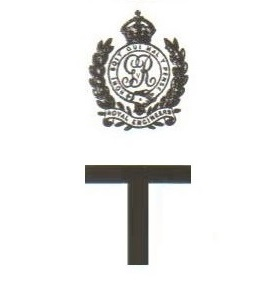
- Active: 1916–19
- Country: Australia
- Branch: Australian Imperial Force
- Type: Royal Engineer tunnelling company
- Role: Military engineering Tunnel warfare
- Nickname: "The Diggers"
- Engagements: World War I: Battle of Messines; Battle of Passchendaele; Operation Hush

The 2nd Australian Tunnelling Company was one of the tunnelling companies of the Royal Australian Engineers during World War I. The tunnelling units were occupied in offensive and defensive mining involving the placing and maintaining of mines under enemy lines, as well as other underground work such as the construction of deep dugouts for troop accommodation, the digging of subways, saps (a narrow trench dug to approach enemy trenches), cable trenches and underground chambers for signals and medical services.

== Background ==
By January 1915 it had become evident to the BEF at the Western Front that the Germans were mining to a planned system. As the British had failed to develop suitable counter-tactics or underground listening devices before the war, field marshals French and Kitchener agreed to investigate the suitability of forming British mining units. Following consultations between the Engineer-in-Chief of the BEF, Brigadier George Fowke, and the mining specialist John Norton-Griffiths, the War Office formally approved the tunnelling company scheme on 19 February 1915.

Norton-Griffiths ensured that tunnelling companies numbers 170 to 177 were ready for deployment in mid-February 1915. In the spring of that year, there was constant underground fighting in the Ypres Salient at Hooge, Hill 60, Railway Wood, Sanctuary Wood, St Eloi and The Bluff which required the deployment of new drafts of tunnellers for several months after the formation of the first eight companies. The lack of suitably experienced men led to some tunnelling companies starting work later than others. The number of units available to the BEF was also restricted by the need to provide effective counter-measures to the German mining activities. To make the tunnels safer and quicker to deploy, the British Army enlisted experienced coal miners, many outside their nominal recruitment policy. The first nine companies, numbers 170 to 178, were each commanded by a regular Royal Engineers officer. These companies each comprised 5 officers and 269 sappers; they were aided by additional infantrymen who were temporarily attached to the tunnellers as required, which almost doubled their numbers. The success of the first tunnelling companies formed under Norton-Griffiths' command led to mining being made a separate branch of the Engineer-in-Chief's office under Major-General S.R. Rice, and the appointment of an 'Inspector of Mines' at the GHQ Saint-Omer office of the Engineer-in-Chief. A second group of tunnelling companies were formed from Welsh miners from the 1st and 3rd Battalions of the Monmouthshire Regiment, who were attached to the 1st Northumberland Field Company of the Royal Engineers, which was a Territorial unit. The formation of twelve new tunnelling companies, between July and October 1915, helped to bring more men into action in other parts of the Western Front. Most British tunnelling companies were formed under Norton-Griffiths' leadership during 1915, and one more was added in 1916.

On 10 September 1915, the British government sent an appeal to Canada, South Africa, Australia and New Zealand to raise tunnelling companies in the Dominions of the British Empire. On 17 September, New Zealand became the first Dominion to agree the formation of a tunnelling unit. The New Zealand Tunnelling Company arrived at Plymouth on 3 February 1916 and was deployed to the Western Front in northern France. The Royal Australian Engineers formed four mining units – initially grouped into the Australian Mining Corps – for the British Expeditionary Force, all of which were operational by March 1916. Three were specialist companies of tunnellers (1st, 2nd, 3rd), while the Australian Electrical Mechanical Boring and Mining Company was tasked with carrying out related repairs. A Canadian tunnelling unit was formed from men on the battlefield, plus two other companies trained in Canada and then shipped to France, resulting in 30 tunnelling companies being available by the summer of 1916.

== Unit history ==
=== Formation ===
In early 1915, while the Royal Australian Engineers were deployed in Egypt, the battalion-sized "Australian Mining Corps" was assembled from men with a background in civilian mining. The intention was to employ this unit, which was at that time about 1,000 strong, with the ANZAC at Gallipoli, but instead it was moved to France in May 1916, where it also appeared as the "Australian Mining Battalion". Soon after arriving in western Europe in May 1916, the battalion was split into three tunnelling and one repairs company, and the corps headquarters dissolved.

=== Vimy ===
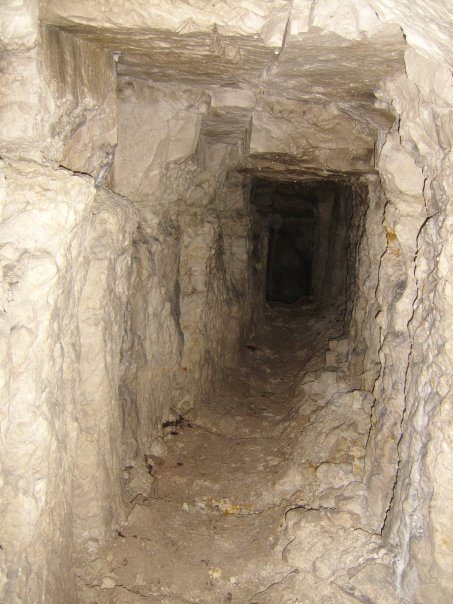
British-dug fighting tunnel in Vimy sector

The 2nd Australian Tunnelling Company relieved the 172nd Tunnelling Company in May 1916 in the Neuville-Saint-Vaast/Vimy area. In this sector was the German "Labyrinth" stronghold, located between Arras and Vimy and not far from Notre Dame de Lorette. On 29 March 1916, the 185th Tunnelling Company had been relieved at Roclincourt-Chantecler by the New Zealand Tunnelling Company, following which it moved to Neuville-Saint-Vaast. The 176th Tunnelling Company moved to Neuville-Saint-Vaast in April 1916 and remained there for a considerable time; the 185th Tunnelling Company dug subways near Neuville-Saint-Vaast until early 1917.

=== Ypres Salient ===
In January 1917, the company relieved the 1st Canadian Tunnelling Company at The Bluff in the Ypres Salient. They moved to Nieuport in the same month, to construct subways as part of Operation Hush. On 10 May 1917, the company took over the 1st Canadian Tunnelling Company's workings at the Lock Hospital position. The Canadian unit had used a Whittaker tunnel boring machine for their work, but tunnelling by machine in the Belgian blue clay was problematic and their War Diary lists numerous stoppages for repairs. The Lock Hospital position was located at Lock 6 on the Ypres-Comines canal, and the tunnel extended from there to a point beneath the British lines some 400 metres away. The final approach gallery beneath no-man's land to the German trenches was to be completed by the silent clay-kicking method. In the end, problems with the machinery and the geology led to this project being abandoned.

=== Messines 1916/17 ===
As part of the preparations for the Battle of Messines in June 1917, the 2nd Australian Tunnelling Company began work on deep dugouts in the Ypres Salient. The Battle of Messines was a prelude to the much larger Third Battle of Ypres (31 July – 10 November 1917). The underground building activities of the Royal Engineer units consisted of a series of deep mines dug by the British 171st, 175th, 250th, 1st Canadian, 3rd Canadian and 1st Australian Tunnelling companies to be fired at the start of the Battle of Messines (7–14 June 1917), while the British 183rd, 2nd Canadian and 2nd Australian Tunnelling companies built underground shelters in the Second Army area. The mines at Messines were detonated on 7 June 1917, creating 19 large craters.

=== Belgian coast ===
In the coastal sector at Nieuport/Nieuwpoort, the 2nd Australian Tunnelling Company was involved in repelling a German spoiling attack – Operation Strandfest – in July 1917. The British 256th and 257th Tunnelling Companies were also involved. Afterwards the 2nd Australian Tunnelling Company constructed deep dugouts in the sand dunes of Nieuport Bains to assist 66th (2nd East Lancashire) Divisional Engineers in strengthening the defences. By 14 November 1917, the 2nd Australian Tunnelling Company was still engaged in the Nieuport Bains/Nieuwpoort-Bad sector.

In April 1918, troops of the 2nd Australian Tunnelling Company fought a large fire in Peronne.

== See also ==
- Mine warfare
