= Strongpoint =

Term in military tactics

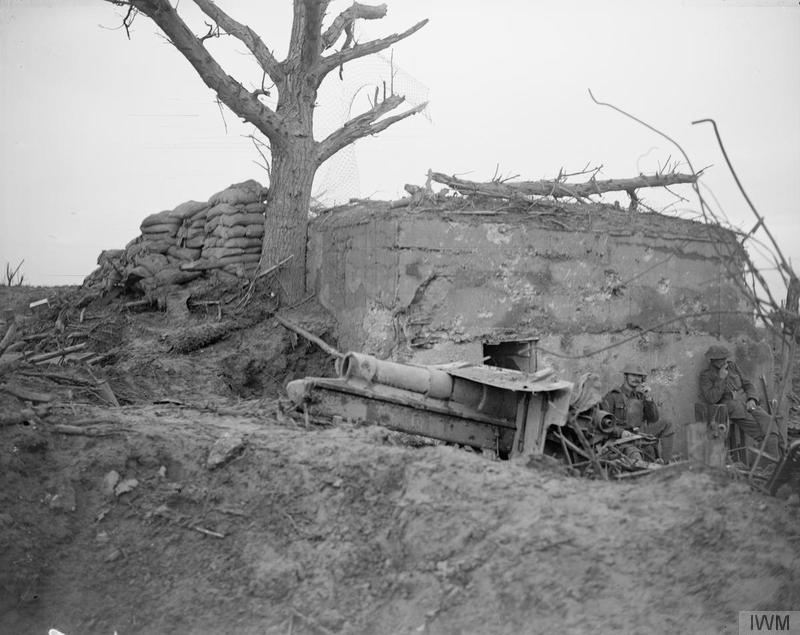
A German concrete pillbox or blockhouse after capture by the Coldstream Guards on the outskirts of Houlthulst Forest, Battle of Poelcappelle, 10 October 1917

In military tactics, a strongpoint is a key point in a defensive fighting position which anchors the overall defense line. This may include redoubts, bunkers, pillboxes, trenches or fortresses, alone or in combination; the primary requirement is that it should not be easily overrun or avoided. A blocking position in good defensive terrain commanding the lines of communication, such as high ground, is preferred. Examples from history include Thermopylae, where the ancient Greeks held back a much larger Persian army, and Monte Cassino, which anchored the Winter Line in Italy in World War II.
