= Camouflet =

Artificial cavern created by an explosion

A camouflet, in military science, is an artificial cavern created by an explosion; if the resulting structure is open to the surface it is called a crater.

The term was originally defined as a countermine dug by defenders to prevent the undermining of a fortress's walls during a siege. The defenders would dig a tunnel under the attackers' tunnel. An explosive charge would be detonated to create a camouflet that would collapse the attackers' tunnel.

More recently, the term has been used to describe the effects of very large bombs like the Grand Slam bomb, which are designed to penetrate next to a large target structure and create a camouflet to undermine the foundations of the structure. It has been observed that it is more efficient to penetrate ground next to the target than to hit the target directly.

A camouflet set describes a system used in the British Army for cratering tracks and other routes. A tube is driven into the ground using a manual post driver. The end of the tube is a disposable steel point. A small charge connected to a detonator is lowered down the tube. The tube is then removed, and the hole tamped. The charge is then blown, leaving a void and a hole to the surface. This void is then filled with a much larger charge, which is also tamped, and then blown when required to create a crater as an obstacle. A refinement was introduced in the 1980s, with the use of a shaped charge to create the initial hole.

Because of the presence of high levels of toxic fumes from the explosive, including carbon monoxide, and the weakness of the soft earth overlying the cavern, camouflets are extremely hazardous to bomb disposal personnel.

== See also ==
- Bangalore torpedo
- Canadian pipe mine
- Flame fougasse
- Special Atomic Demolition Munition
