= Funerary and memory sites of the First World War (Western Front) =

UNESCO World Heritage Site
- Location: Belgium; France
- Includes: 139 locations in two countries
- Criteria: Cultural: (iii)(iv)(vi)
- Reference: 1567
- Inscription: 2023 (45th Session)

Funerary and memory sites of the First World War (Western Front) is a UNESCO World Heritage Site which incorporates 139 cemeteries and memorials on the Western Front of the First World War. On 20 September 2023, UNESCO designated the locations as a World Heritage site.

== Sites ==
=== Belgium ===
- Belgian military cemetery: Houthulst
- Belgian military cemetery: Oeren
- Canadian national monument: The Brooding Soldier
- Commonwealth military cemetery: 1st D.C.L.I. Cemetery, The Bluff
- Commonwealth military cemetery: Bedford House Cemetery
- Commonwealth military cemetery: Buff’s Road Cemetery
- Commonwealth military cemetery: Buttes New British Cemetery
- Commonwealth military cemetery: Essex farm Cemetery
- Commonwealth military cemetery: Hedge Row Trench Cemetery
- Commonwealth military cemetery: Hyde Park Corner Cemetery
- Commonwealth military cemetery: Larch Wood Cemetery
- Commonwealth military cemetery: Lijssenthoek military cemetery
- Commonwealth military cemetery: Lone Tree Cemetery
- Commonwealth military cemetery: Mud Corner Cemetery
- Commonwealth military cemetery: No Man’s Cot Cemetery
- Commonwealth military cemetery: Ploegsteert Wood Military Cemetery
- Commonwealth military cemetery: Polygon Wood Cemetery
- Commonwealth military cemetery: Prowse Point Military Cemetery
- Commonwealth military cemetery: Rifle House Cemetery
- Commonwealth military cemetery: Spanbroekmolen British Cemetery
- Commonwealth military cemetery: Strand Military Cemetery
- Commonwealth military cemetery: Toronto Avenue Cemetery
- Commonwealth military cemetery: Track X Cemetery
- Commonwealth military cemetery: Tyne Cot Cemetery and Commonwealth memorial to the missing Tyne Cot Memorial
- Commonwealth military cemetery: Welsh Cemetery (Caesar's Nose)
- Commonwealth military cemetery: Woods Cemetery
- Commonwealth military cemetery and memorial to the missing: Berks Cemetery Extension and Ploegsteert Memorial to the Missing
- Commonwealth monument to the missing: Menin Gate
- Commonwealth monument to the missing: Nieuport Memorial
- Commonwealth-German military cemetery: Saint-Symphorien
- Crypt of the Yser tower
- Fort of Loncin
- French military cemetery: l’Orée de la Forêt
- French military cemetery: la Belle Motte
- French military cemetery: le Plateau
- French military cemetery: Saint-Charles de Potyze
- French ossuary: the Kemmel mountain
- French-German military cemetery: le Radan
- German military cemetery: Langemark
- German military cemetery: Vladslo
- Irish monument: Island of Ireland Peace Tower
- Military plots: Robermont
- Plot of the executed: Tamines

=== France ===
- American military cemetery and memorial: St. Mihiel American Cemetery and Memorial
- American military cemetery and memorial: Aisne-Marne American Cemetery and Memorial
- American military cemetery and memorial: Meuse-Argonne American Cemetery and Memorial
- Australian national memorial: Villers-Bretonneux Memorial and Commonwealth military cemetery: Villers-Bretonneux Military Cemetery
- Canadian national memorial: Vimy Memorial
- Commonwealth memorials: Beaumont Hamel (Newfoundland) Memorial & 29th Division Memorial, Commonwealth memorial park: Beaumont Hamel (Newfoundland) Memorial Park and Commonwealth military cemetery Hunter's Cemetery
- Commonwealth military cemetery: Canadian Cemetery n°2
- Commonwealth military cemetery: Étaples Military Cemetery
- Commonwealth military cemetery: Fromelles (Pheasant Wood) Military Cemetery
- Commonwealth military cemetery: Givenchy Road Canadian Cemetery
- Commonwealth military cemetery: Le Quesnoy communal Cemetery extension
- Commonwealth military cemetery: Lichfield Crater
- Commonwealth military cemetery: Louvencourt Military Cemetery
- Commonwealth military cemetery: Mill Road Cemetery
- Commonwealth military cemetery: Noyelles-sur-mer Chinese Cemetery and Chinese memorial Noyelles-sur-mer Chinese Memorial
- Commonwealth military cemetery: Rancourt Military Cemetery
- Commonwealth military cemetery: Wimereux communal cemetery
- Commonwealth military cemetery and Australian memorial: V.C. Corner Australian Cemetery and Memorial
- Commonwealth military cemetery and memorial: Dud Corner Cemetery and Loos Memorial
- Commonwealth military cemetery and memorial: Louverval Military Cemetery and Cambrai Memorial
- Commonwealth military cemetery and memorial: Pozières British Cemetery and Pozières Memorial
- Commonwealth military cemetery and memorials: Faubourg D’amiens Cemetery, Arras Memorial and Arras Flying Services Memorial
- Commonwealth monument to the missing: Thiepval Memorial and French-Commonwealth military cemetery: Thiepval Anglo-French Cemetery
- Czechoslovak military cemetery: Neuville-Saint-Vaast
- Danish military cemetery: Braine
- Fort of Douaumont
- French headstones of the executed of Fleury-devant-Douaumont
- French memorial: Les fantômes
- French memorial of the battles of the Marne
- French military cemetery: Germania
- French military plot of the dead of November 11, 1918 of Vrigne-Meuse
- French Monument-ossuary: Haute-Chevauchée
- French municipal cemetery and chapel: Mondement-Montgivroux
- French national cemetery: the prisoners of war: Sarrebourg
- French national necropolis and chapel: le Souvenir Français of Rancourt
- French national necropolis and German military cemetery: la Crouée
- French national necropolis: La Grande Tombe de Villeroy
- French national necropolis: Assevent & German military cemetery: Assevent
- French national necropolis: Cerny-en-Laonnois, German military cemetery: Cerny-en-Laonnois and memorial chapel of le Chemin des Dames
- French national necropolis: Chambière
- French national necropolis: Compiègne (Royallieu)
- French national necropolis: Craonnelle
- French national necropolis: Cuts
- French national necropolis: Duchesne
- French national necropolis: l’Espérance
- French national necropolis: l’Opéra
- French national necropolis: la Chipotte
- French national necropolis: la Fontenelle
- French national necropolis: la Forestière
- French national necropolis: La Harazée
- French national necropolis: la Maize
- French national necropolis: la Targette & Commonwealth military cemetery: La Targette British Cemetery
- French national necropolis: Lagarde
- French national necropolis: le Faubourg Pavé
- French national necropolis: le Silberloch, French national monument and crypt of the Hartmannswillerkopf
- French national necropolis: Le Sourd & German military cemetery: Le Sourd
- French national necropolis: le Trottoir
- French national necropolis: le Wettstein
- French national necropolis: les Tiges
- French national necropolis: Moosch
- French national necropolis: Navarin: monument to the dead of the armies of Champagne
- French national necropolis: Notre-Dame-de-Lorette
- French national necropolis: Pierrepont
- French national necropolis: Riche
- French national necropolis: Saint-Thomas en Argonne & French national necropolis: the monument-ossuary of la Gruerie
- French national necropolis: the 28th brigade La ferme des Wacques
- French national necropolis: the monument-ossuary of the French Foreign Legion (Henri Fansworth)
- French national necropolis: the prisoners of Effry
- French national necropolis: Thiescourt & German military cemetery: Thiescourt
- French national necropolis, German military cemetery and Polish military cemetery: le Bois du Puits
- French ossuary, French national necropolis, Isrealien monument and Muslim monument: Douaumont (Douaumont Ossuary)
- French plot: civilian casualties of Gerbeviller
- German and French headstones and tombs: le Petit Donon
- German military cemetery: Apremont
- German military cemetery: Chestres & French national necropolis: Chestres
- German military cemetery: Consenvoye
- German military cemetery: Gobessart
- German military cemetery: Hohrod-Bärenstall
- German military cemetery: Kahm
- German military cemetery: l’Hellenwald
- German military cemetery: la Maison Blanche
- German military cemetery: la Route de Solesmes and Commonwealth military cemetery: Cambrai East Military Cemetery
- German military cemetery: Lagarde
- German military cemetery: Pierrepont
- German military cemetery: Rancourt
- German military cemetery: Saint-Quentin & German-French monument: Saint-Quentin
- German military cemetery: the Uhlans
- German military cemetery: Veslud
- German monument: the Saint-Charles cemetery
- Indian memorial: the Commonwealth Neuve Chapelle Memorial
- Italian military cemetery: Bligny
- Portuguese military cemetery: Richebourg-l’Avoué
- Roumanian military cemetery: Soultzmatt
- Russian military cemetery and chapel: Saint-Hilaire-le-Grand
- South-African national memorial: The South Africa (Delville Wood) National Memorial and Commonwealth military cemetery: Delville Wood Cemetery
- Trench of the bayonets
