= Minty Farm Cemetery =

British military WWI cemetery in West Flanders, Belgium

- Commonwealth War Graves Commission
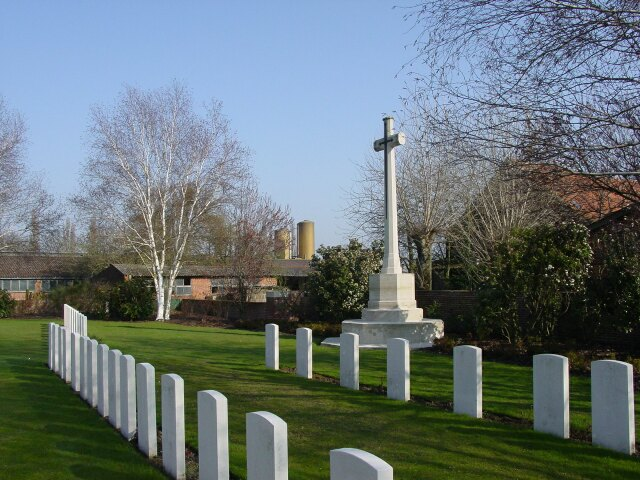
- Minty Farm Cemetery
- For First World War
- Established: October 1917
- Location: 50.8907°N 2.90928°E; Langemark, West Flanders, Belgium
- Designed by: William Harrison Cowlishaw
- Total burials: 193

Burials by nation
- * United Kingdom: 192: German Empire: 1

Minty Farm Cemetery is a Commonwealth War Graves Commission military cemetery containing British burials from the First World War, located in the Belgian province of West Flanders.

The cemetery is located 0.6 miles (0.97 km) east of Langemark and 4.3 miles (6.9 km) north of Ypres.

== History ==
During the First World War, Minty Farm was used first by the Germans as a small fortification until it was overtaken by the British Army who used the area as a local headquarters.

The cemetery opened in October 1917, mostly the casualties of the Royal Artillery, whose guns were based nearby.

== Location ==
The cemetery is easily found by travelling to Langemark, close to Ypres, and then driving along Hemelrijkstraat- where the cemetery is located.
