= Howe, Norfolk =

Village in Norfolk, England

Coordinates: 52.55061°N 1.35565°E

Howe
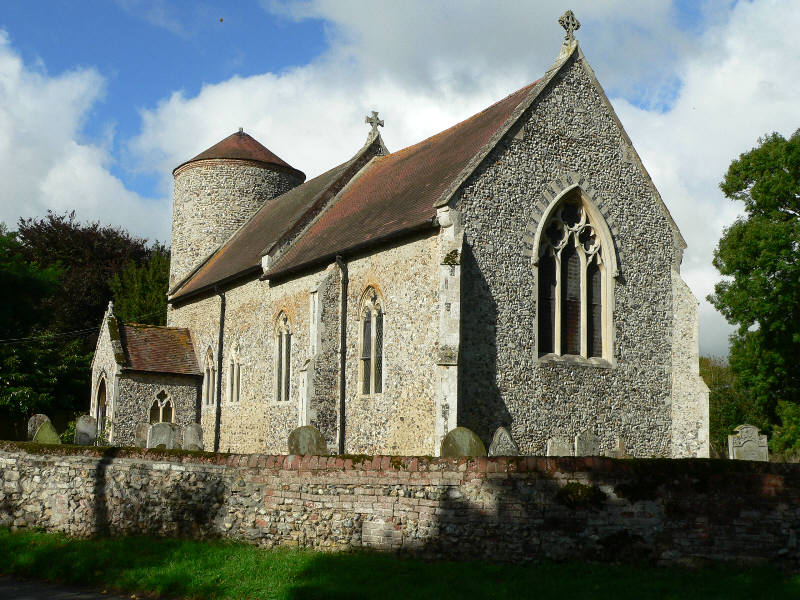
- St. Mary's Church

- Location within Norfolk
- Area: 1.24 sq mi (3.2 km^{2})
- OS grid reference: TG275000
- Civil parish: Howe
- District: South Norfolk
- Shire county: Norfolk
- Region: East
- Country: England
- Sovereign state: United Kingdom
- Post town: NORWICH
- Postcode district: NR15
- Dialling code: 01508
- UK Parliament: South Norfolk

Howe is a village and civil parish in English county of Norfolk.

Howe is located 5.5 miles (8.9 km) west of Loddon and 5.6 miles (9.0 km) south of Norwich.

== History ==
The name Howe is of Viking origin and derives from the Old Norse for mound, a howe.

In the Domesday Book, Howe is listed as a settlement of 56 households in the hundred of Henstead. In 1086, the village was divided between the East Anglian estates of King William I and St. Edmunds Abbey.

Howe Hall was built in the Seventeenth Century.

== Geography ==
Due to its small size, separate population statistics for Howe have not been returned for the last three censuses.

== St. Mary's Church ==
Howe's parish church is dedicated to Saint Mary and dates from Twelfth Century with some Roman material, being one of Norfolk's 124 remaining round-tower churches. St. Mary's is located on 'The Green' and has been Grade II listed since 1960. The church holds Sunday service once a month and is part of the Poringland Benefice.

St. Mary's also holds a carved lectern made in the French-style and a stained-glass window depicting Faith, Hope and Charity by Robert Bayne.

== Governance ==
Howe is part of the electoral ward of Newton Flotman for local elections and is part of the district of South Norfolk.

The village's national constituency is South Norfolk which has been represented by the Labour's Ben Goldsborough MP since 2024.

== War Memorial ==
Howe's war memorial is an elaborate wooden triptych inside St. Mary's Church which lists the following names for the First World War:

Rank	Name	Unit	Date of death	Burial/Commemoration
A/Bdr.	Edward Symonds	1st Bty., Royal Garrison Artillery	27 Sep. 1917	Huts Cemetery
LSig.	Bertie E. Stone	HMS Cressy (Cruiser)	22 Sep. 1914	Chatham Naval Memorial
St1C	Herbert W. Kemp	HMS Mignonette (Sloop)	17 Mar. 1917	Chatham Naval Memorial
Dvr.	William L. Herwin	141st Coy., Royal Engineers	28 Mar. 1918	Brandhoek New Cemetery
Pte.	Frederick W. Vann	1st Bn., Cambridgeshire Regiment	31 Jul. 1917	Buffs Road Cemetery
Pte.	Herbert Pitchers	2nd Bn., Cheshire Regiment	25 May 1915	Menin Gate

The following name was added after the Second World War:

Rank	Name	Unit	Date of death	Burial/Commemoration
Pte.	William B. Downing	2nd Bn., Royal Norfolk Regiment	27 May 1940	Le Paradis War Cemetery
