= Spanbroekmolen =

Farming region in Belgium

Coordinates: 50°46′33″N 2°51′42″E

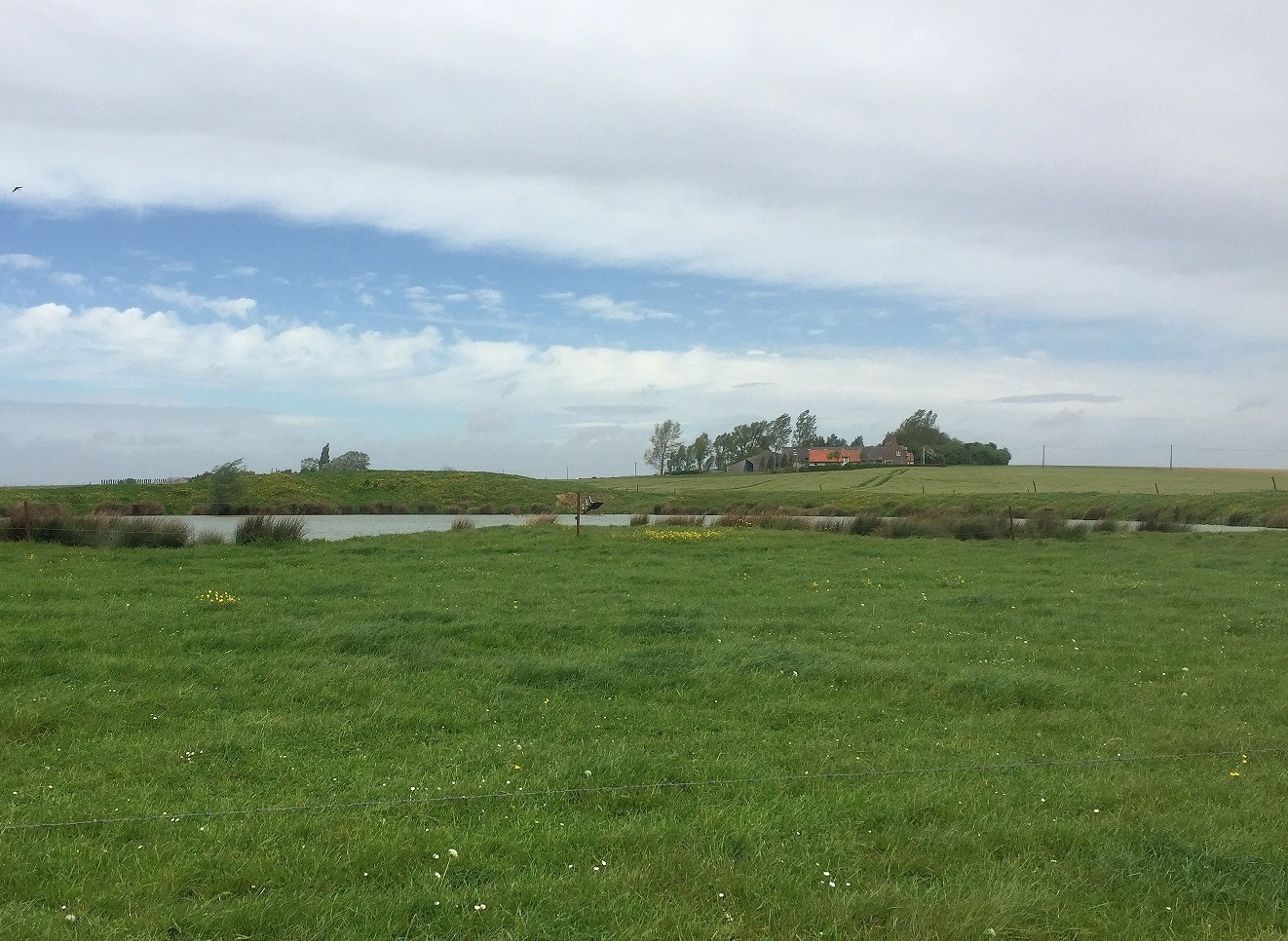
View of the Messines Ridge with the Spanbroekmolen site; the crater of the British mine fired on 7 June 1917 is in the wooded area behind the farm on the right.

Spanbroekmolen is a small group of farms in Heuvelland, a municipality located in the Belgian province of West Flanders. The hamlet is sited on one of the highest points of the Messines Ridge, in between the villages of Kemmel, Wijtschate and Wulvergem.

== History ==
C. G. Martin, VC

Spanbroekmolen was named after a windmill that stood on the site for three centuries until it was ruined by the Germans on 1 November 1914. In World War I, the area was the site of intense and sustained fighting between German and British forces. Between 1914 and 1917, the Western Front ran through the area, and the original buildings were completely destroyed. Because of its strategic position on the Messines Ridge south of the Ypres Salient, the Germans used the site for a front-line fortification. As the Allied attacks along the Western Front became more formidable, the Germans added further defences and trench positions at Spanbroekmolen and connected their original lines with the neighbouring strongpoints, which were code-named Peckham and Kruisstraat by the British.

On 12 March 1915, Lieutenant C. G. Martin volunteered to lead a small bombing party against a section of the enemy trenches at Spanbroekmolen which was holding up the advance. Before he started he was wounded, but, taking no notice, he carried on with the attack which was completely successful. He and his small party held the trench against all counter-attacks for two and a half hours until a general withdrawal was ordered and Martin was awarded the Victoria Cross. He later achieved the rank of Brigadier and served during World War II.

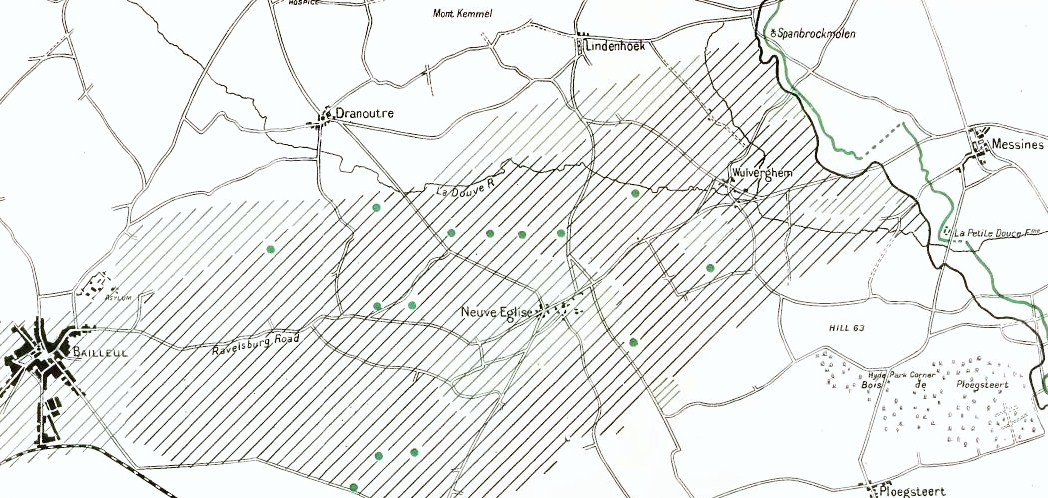
Diagram showing the area affected by the German cloud gas attack on 30 April 1916. Green dots: cattle deaths, heavy shading: seriously affected, helmets worn, light shading: lightly affected

In spring 1916, the Germans conducted two gas attacks on Wulverghem from their Spanbroekmolen position. These gas attacks were part of the sporadic fighting which took place between battles in the Ypres Salient. The British Second Army held the ground from Messines Ridge north to Steenstraat, opposite the German XXIII Reserve Corps. From 21–23 April, British artillery-fire exploded several gas cylinders in the German lines around Spanbroekmolen, which released greenish-yellow clouds of gas. A gas alert was given on 25 April, when the wind began to blow from the north-east and routine work was suspended; on 29 April, two German soldiers deserted and warned that an attack was imminent. The first German attack began just after midnight on 30 April and a cloud of a chlorine and phosgene mixture moved on the wind through no man's land. A second gas attack was launched on 17 June but the British managed to repulse the German patrols.

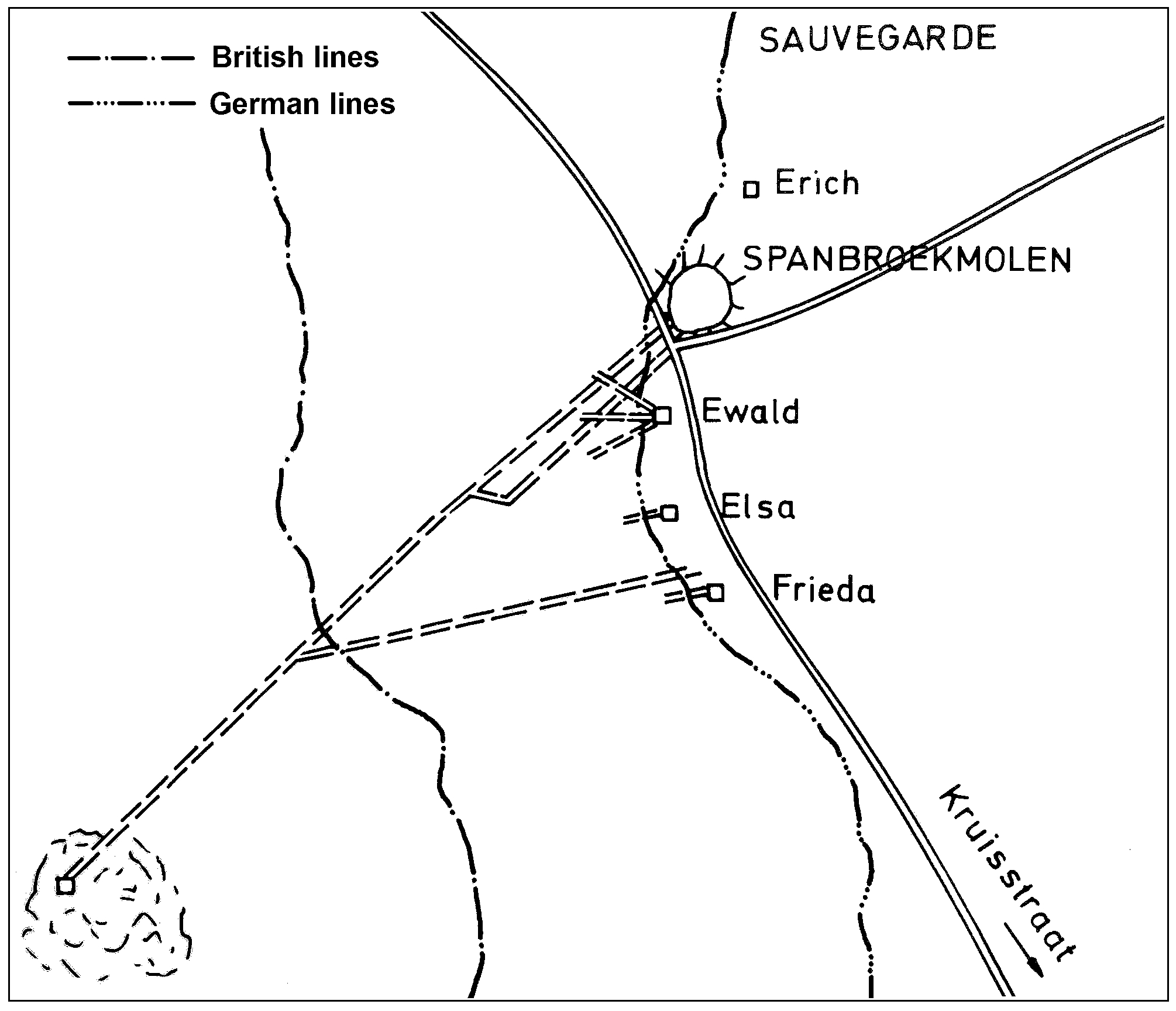
Plan of the British deep mine fired at Spanbroekmolen on 7 June 1917. The abandoned branch gallery and several German counter-mines (Erich, Ewald, Elsa, Frieda) are clearly visible.

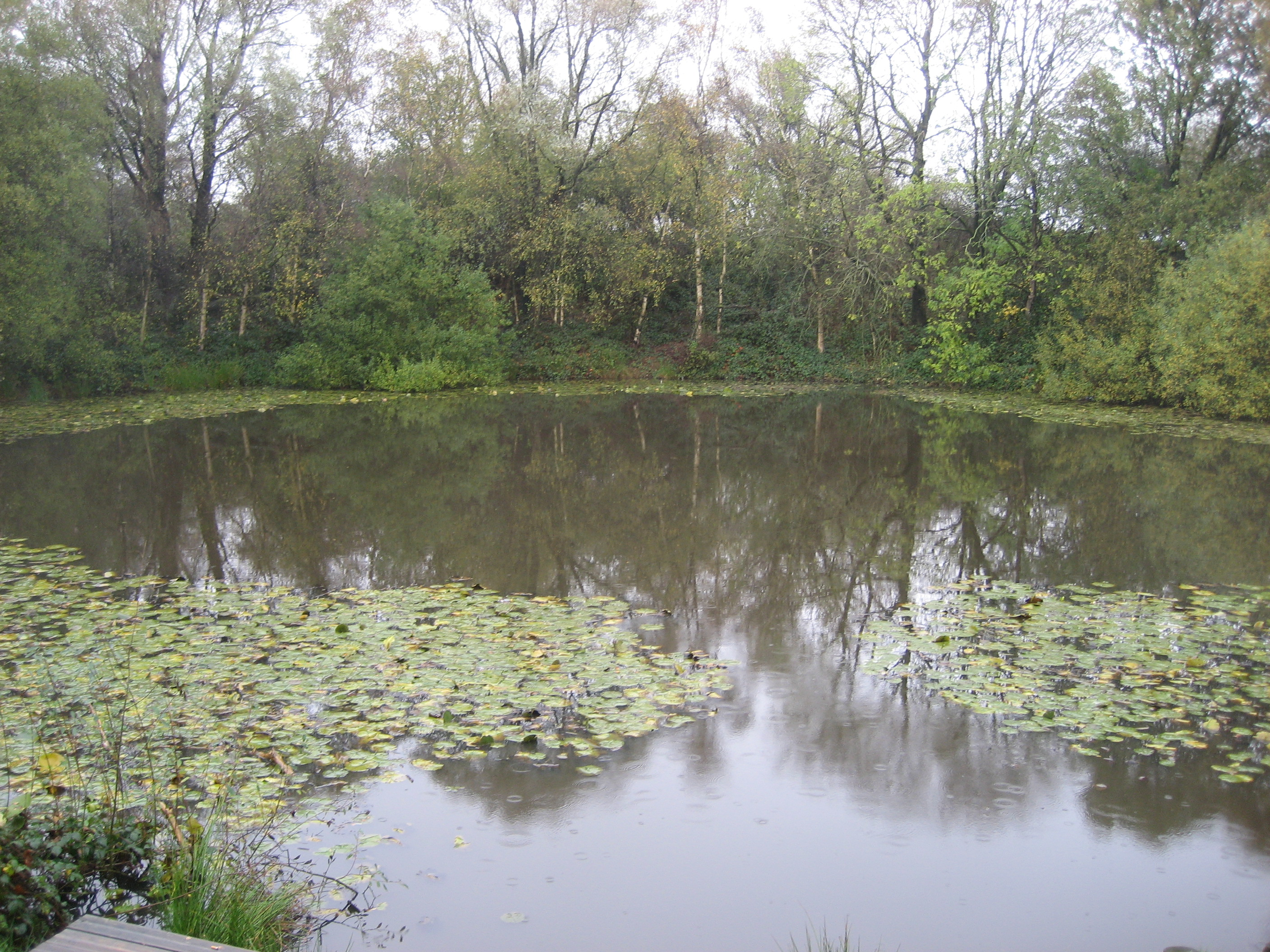
Spanbroekmolen crater in November 2009.

In the Battle of Messines (7–14 June 1917), a major attack on Spanbroekmolen and the neighbouring strongpoints Peckham and Kruisstraat was planned by the British. It was known that, due to its importance, the Germans intended to hold the hill at Spanbroekmolen at all costs (unbedingtes Halten). In order to break the heavily armed positions, the British employed tunnelling companies of the Royal Engineers with the aim of placing a series of mines beneath the German lines on the Messines Ridge. The start point for the Spanbroekmolen mine gallery was in the area of a small wood some 270 metres (300 yd) to the south-west of the hamlet. In December 1915, 250th Tunnelling Company dug a 18 metres (60 ft) shaft and then handed over the work to 3rd Canadian Tunnelling Company in January 1916. Other operating changes – including a brief tenure of 175th Tunnelling Company at Spanbroekmolen in April 1916 – occurred until 171st Tunnelling Company took over and extended the work to the German lines, driving the tunnel forward for seven months until it was beneath the powerful German position. The mine chamber was set 27 metres (88 ft) below ground, at the end of a gallery 521 metres (1,709 ft) long. At the end of June 1916 the charge of 41,000 kilograms (91,000 lb) of ammonal in 1,820 waterproof tins was complete, the largest yet laid by the British. With the mine complete, the British selected two additional objectives to be attacked near Spanbroekmolen, Rag Point and Hop Point, which were 820 metres (2,700 ft) and 1,100 metres (3,500 ft) from the main tunnel. A branch was started and inclined down to 37 metres (120 ft) depth. By mid-February 1917 the branch had been driven 350 metres (1,140 ft) and passed the German lines. At that point, the German counter mining activities damaged 150 metres (500 ft) of the branch gallery and some of the main tunnel. The British decided to abandon the branch gallery because aggressive counter-mining would likely have alerted the Germans to the presence of a deep-mining scheme. On 3 March 1917, the Germans blew the main tunnel with a heavy charge laid from their Ewald shaft, leaving it beyond repair and resulting in the 41,000-kilogram (91,000 lb) explosive charge being cut off for three months. The British started a new gallery alongside the old main tunnel which after 357 metres (1,172 ft) cut into the original workings. Mining was greatly hampered by the influx of gas, several miners being overcome by the fumes, but eventually – and only a few hours before Zero Hour – the main charge was ready again and secured by 120 metres (400 ft) of tamping with sandbags and a primer charge of 450 kilograms (1,000 lb) of dynamite. Although tested fully just a few hours before the attack, officers used torch batteries to prove the circuits. The mines at Messines were detonated at 3:10 a.m. on 7 June 1917. The Spanbroekmolen mine exploded 15 seconds late, by which time soldiers of the 36th (Ulster) Division had already been ordered to go over the top, had left their trenches and begun to move across no-man's land. In addition to obliterating the German fortifications, falling debris from the blast also killed a number of British soldiers, some of whom are buried at Lone Tree CWGC Cemetery nearby. The crater formed by the blast was approximately 76 metres (250 ft) in diameter, and 12 metres (40 ft) deep.

== Commemoration ==
The mine crater was acquired in 1929 by the Toc H foundation in Poperinge. Sometimes also called "Lone Tree Crater", it is today recognised as peace memorial and known as "Pool of Peace". To its south lies the Lone Tree CWGC Cemetery, to its north-east the Spanbroekmolen British CWGC Cemetery.

== Gallery ==
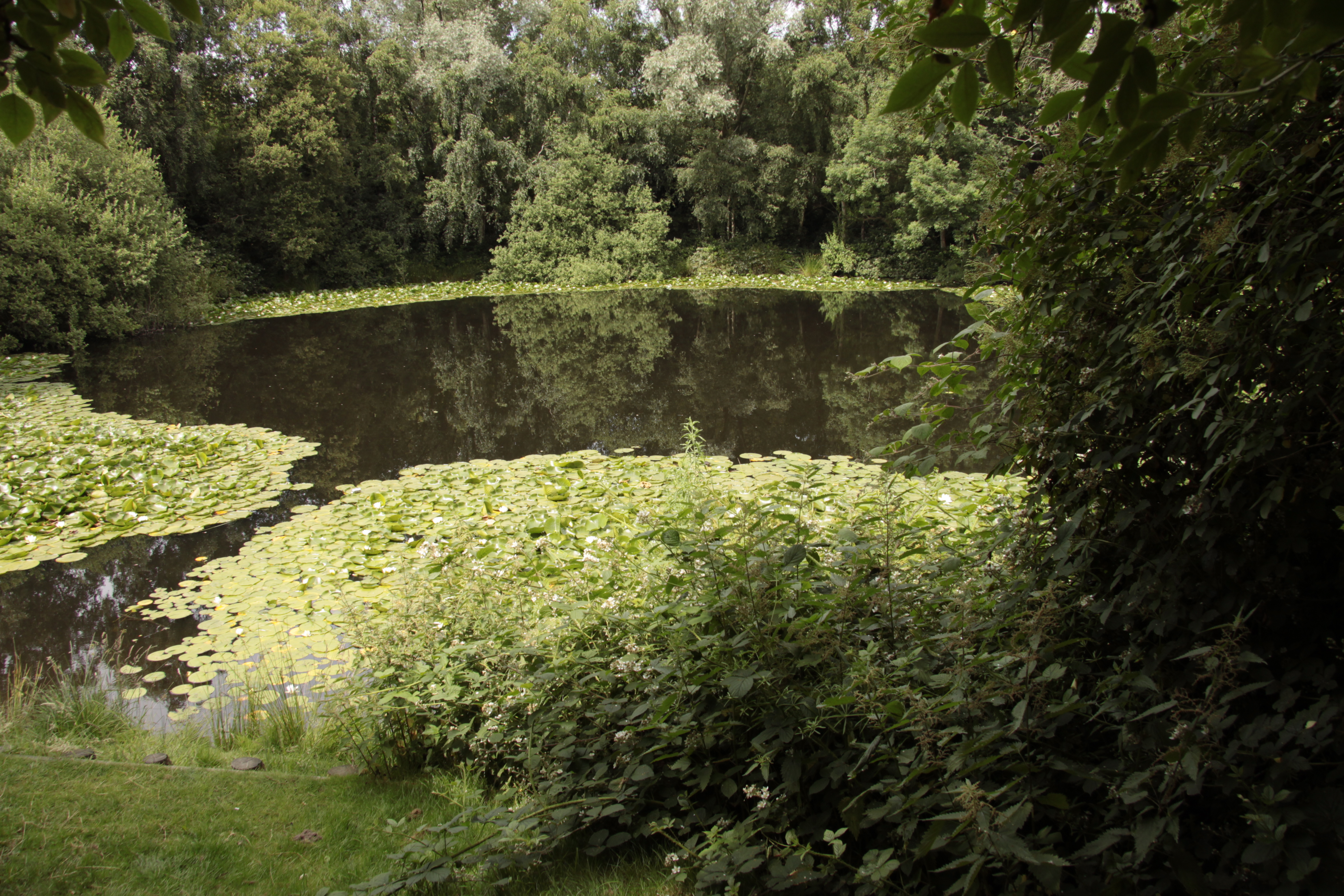
Spanbroekmolen mine crater

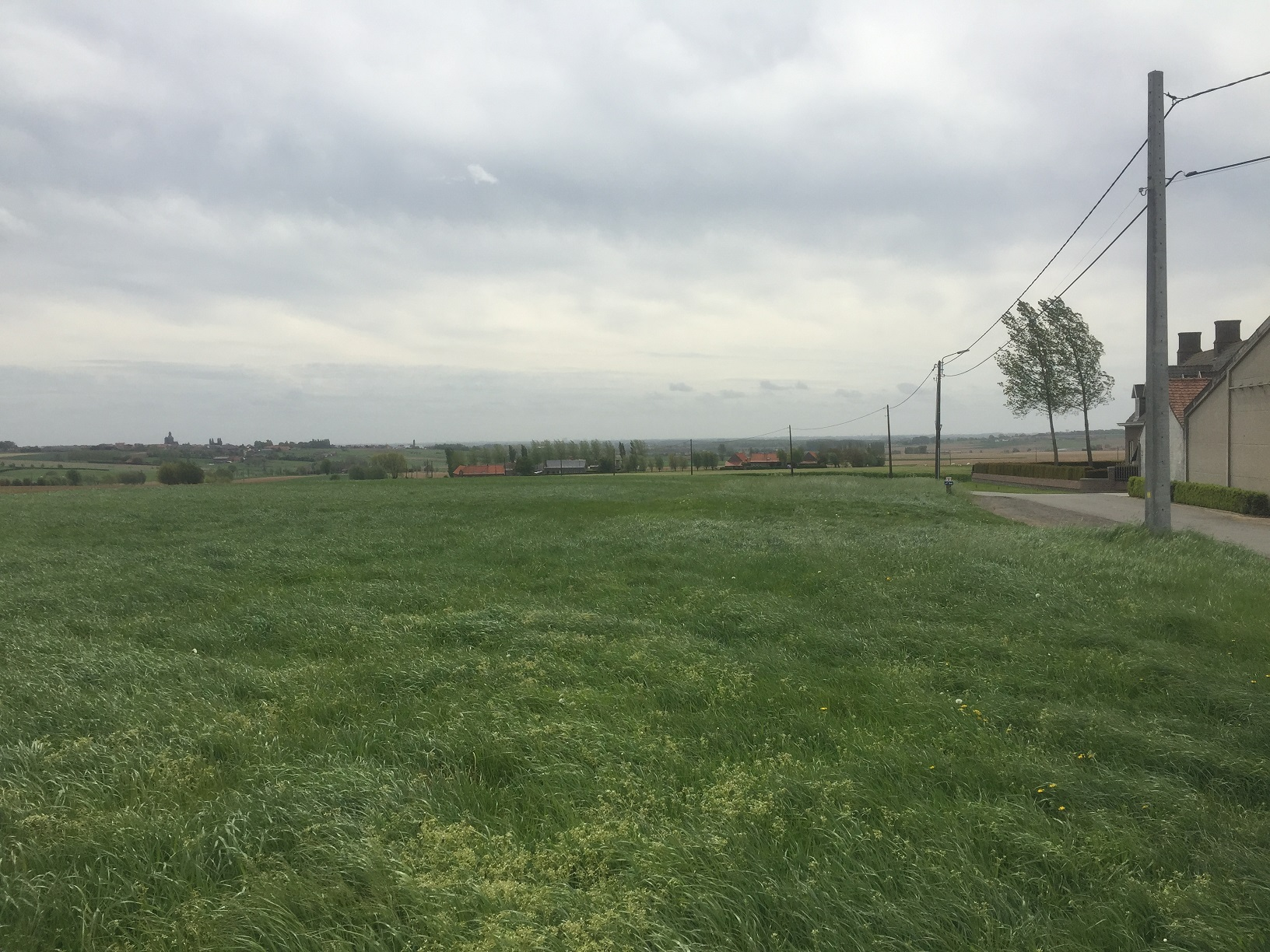
View from Spanbroekmolen crater towards the Kruisstraat craters

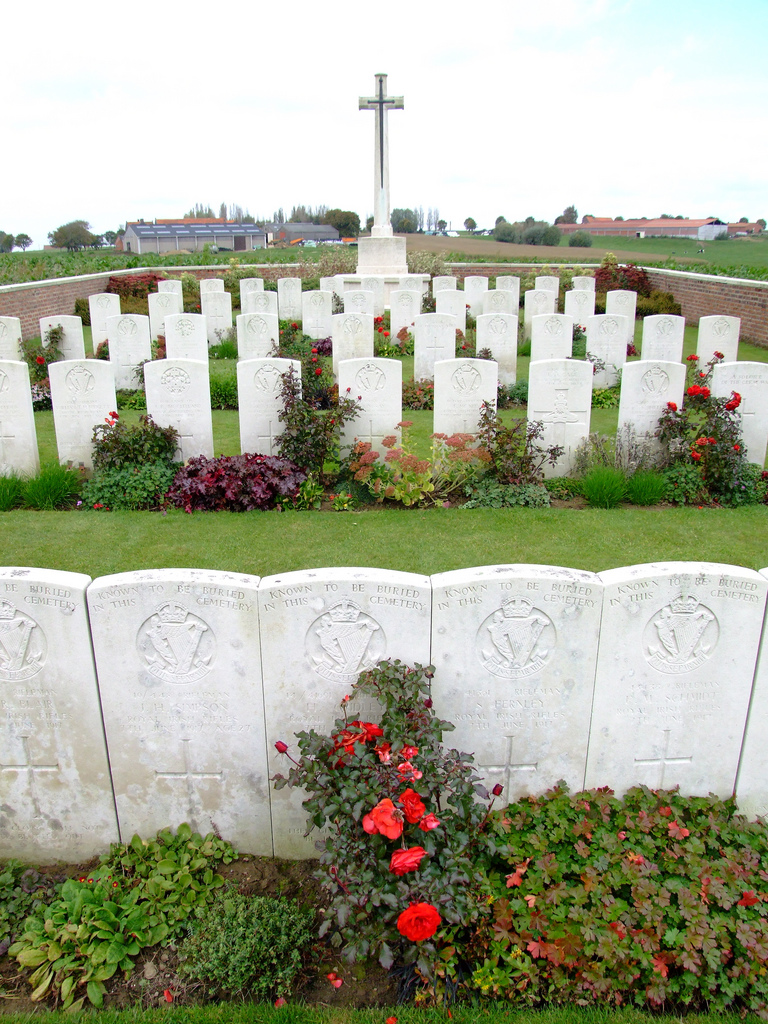
Spanbroekmolen British CWGC Cemetery

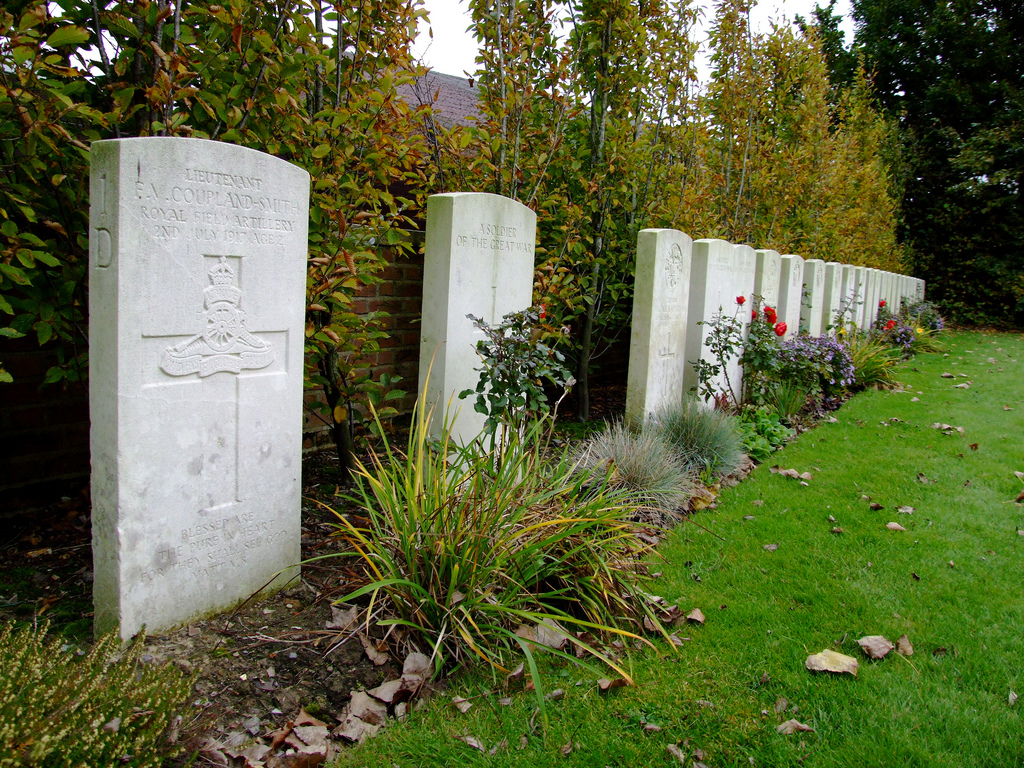
Graves in Lone Tree CWGC Cemetery

== See also ==
- List of World War I memorials and cemeteries in Flanders
