= Track "X" Cemetery =

WWI CWGC cemetery in Ypres, Belgium

Track "X"
- Commonwealth War Graves Commission
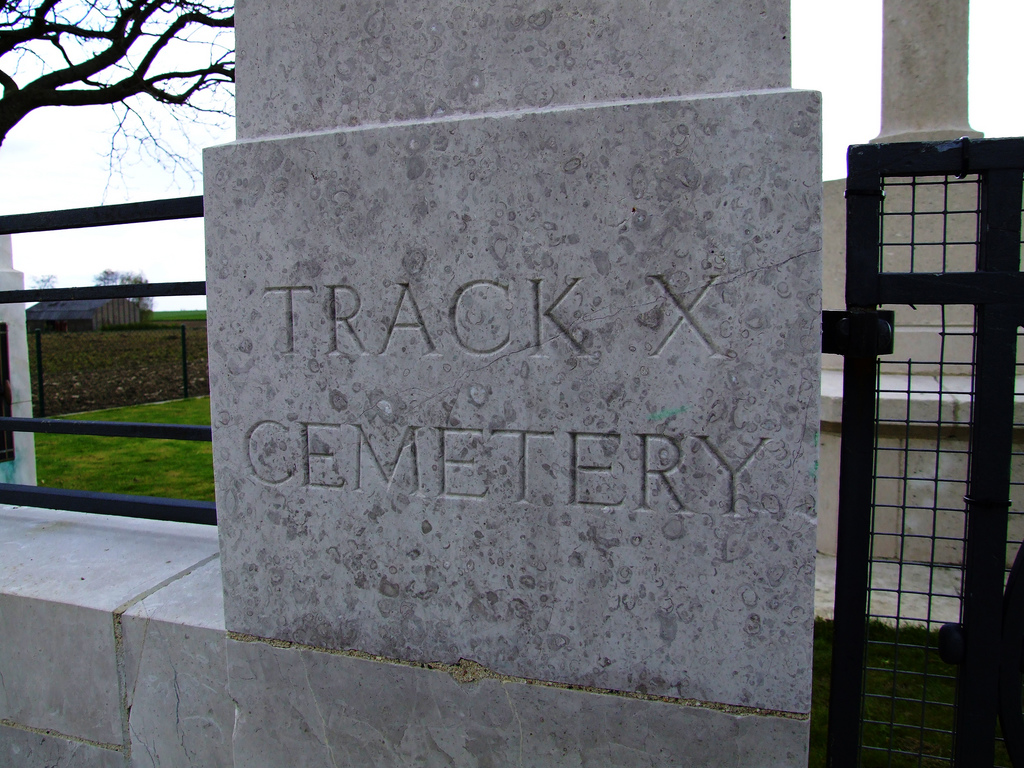
- Used for those deceased 1917–1918
- Established: July 1917
- Location: 50°52′41″N 02°54′42″E near Ypres, West Flanders, Belgium
- Total burials: 143

Burials by nation
- Allies of World War I: United Kingdom: 138; Canada: 5

Burials by war
- World War I: 143

UNESCO World Heritage Site
- Official name: Funerary and memory sites of the First World War (Western Front)
- Type: Cultural
- Criteria: i, ii, vi
- Designated: 2023 (45th session)
- Reference no.: 1567-FL14

Track "X" Cemetery is a Commonwealth War Graves Commission burial ground for the dead of the First World War located near Ypres (Ieper) in Belgium on the Western Front. The cemetery grounds were assigned to the United Kingdom in perpetuity by King Albert I of Belgium in recognition of the sacrifices made by the British Empire in the defence and liberation of Belgium during the war.

== Foundation ==
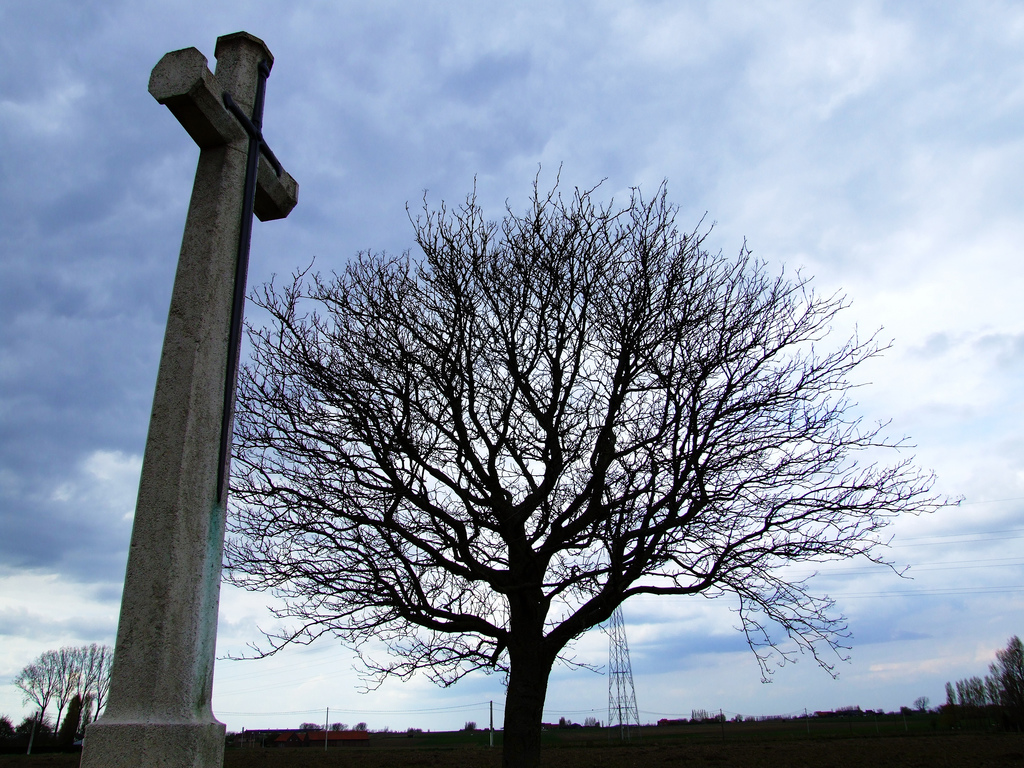
The cemetery's Cross of Sacrifice

The area where this cemetery now stands had been between the two front lines in June 1917. The area was captured and a cemetery was begun in July 1917 by the 39th and 48th (South Midland) Divisions. The cemetery closed in November 1917, although two more burials were made in May 1918.

Archaeological excavations have taken place in the immediate area, around Turco Farm trench, to uncover artifacts and historical details from the Great War.
