= Cyril Gordon Martin =

English Victoria Cross recipient (1891-1980)

- Born: 19 December 1891; Foochow, China
- Died: 14 August 1980 (aged 88); Woolwich, London, England
- Burial place: Eltham Crematorium, London, England
- Military career
- Allegiance: United Kingdom
- Branch: British Army
- Service years: 1911−1946
- Rank: Brigadier
- Service number: 1006
- Units: Royal Engineers
- Conflicts: World War I World War II
- Awards: Victoria Cross; Commander of the Order of the British Empire; Distinguished Service Order

Brigadier Cyril Gordon Martin VC CBE DSO (19 December 1891 – 14 August 1980) was a British Army officer and an English recipient of the Victoria Cross (VC), the highest and most prestigious award for gallantry in the face of the enemy that can be awarded to British and Commonwealth forces.

Martin was educated at Clifton College He was 23 years old, and a lieutenant in the 56th Field Company, Corps of Royal Engineers, British Army during the First World War when the following deed took place for which he was awarded the VC.

On 12 March 1915 at Spanbroekmolen on the Messines Ridge, Belgium, Lieutenant Martin volunteered to lead a small bombing party against a section of the enemy trenches which was holding up the advance. Before he started he was wounded, but, taking no notice, he carried on with the attack which was completely successful. He and his small party held the trench against all counter-attacks for two and a half hours until a general withdrawal was ordered.

He later achieved the rank of Brigadier and served during World War II. Martin was with the Northern Command in India in 1939 as Deputy Chief Engineer. He served in Iraq in 1941 as Chief Engineer, British troops. From 1945-47 he was Chief Engineer with the North-West Army, India. During this time he was also ADC to King George VI.

His Victoria Cross is displayed at the Royal Engineers Museum, Chatham, Kent.

== Bibliography ==
- Buzzell, Nora, ed. (1997). The Register of the Victoria Cross. Cheltenham: This England Alma House. ISBN 0-906324-27-0.
- Harvey, David (2000). Monuments to Courage. Naval & Military Press Ltd. ISBN 1-84342-356-1.
- Napier, Gerald (1998). The Sapper VCs: The Story of Valour in the Royal Engineers and Its Associated Corps. The Stationery Office. ISBN 978-0117728356.
- Batchelor, Peter; Matson, Christopher (2011). The Western Front 1915. VCs of the First World War. Stroud, Gloucestershire: The History Press. ISBN 978-0-7524-6057-4.
