= Bayonet Trench =

French WWI memorial

Coordinates: 49°12′50.8″N 5°25′32.4″E

Bayonet Trench (French: Tranchée des Baïonettes) is a First World War memorial near Verdun, France. The 1920 concrete structure encloses the graves of French soldiers who died on the site, which was a military trench, in June 1916 during the Battle of Verdun. Twenty-one soldiers were buried by German troops within the trench, a common practice at the time. After the war, the graves were discovered with rifles protruding from the ground. This led to the myth that the French soldiers had been buried alive when their trench collapsed during bombardment and died standing with their rifles in their hands. After the war, fourteen of the dead were identified and buried in war cemeteries. The remaining seven dead are buried in the memorial where they were found. The memorial was commissioned by American banker George Franklin Rand and designed by French architect André Ventre. It was finished and dedicated in 1920.

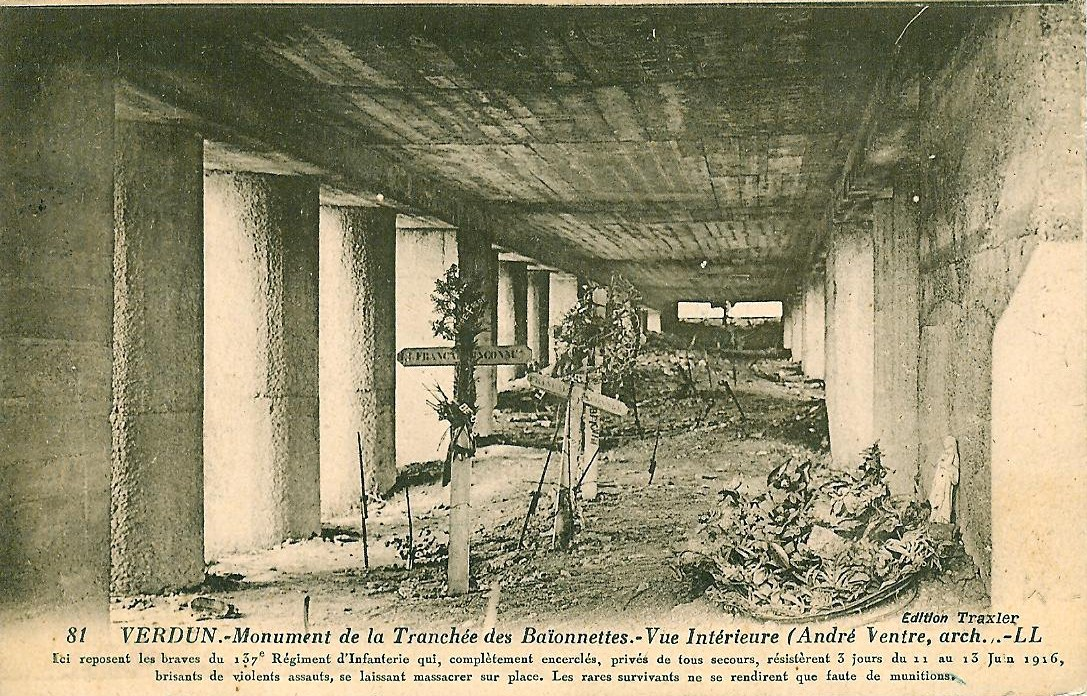
On a 1920s postcard

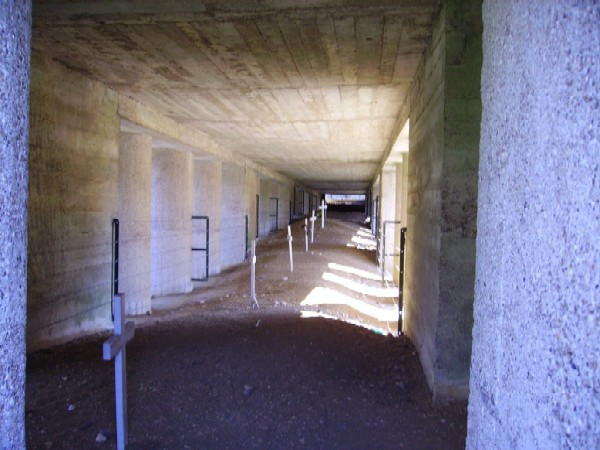
Interior

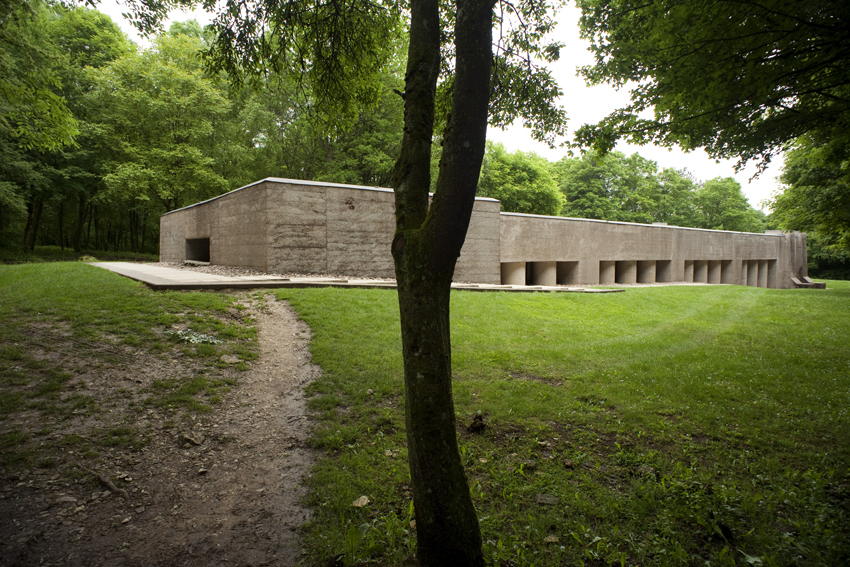
Exterior

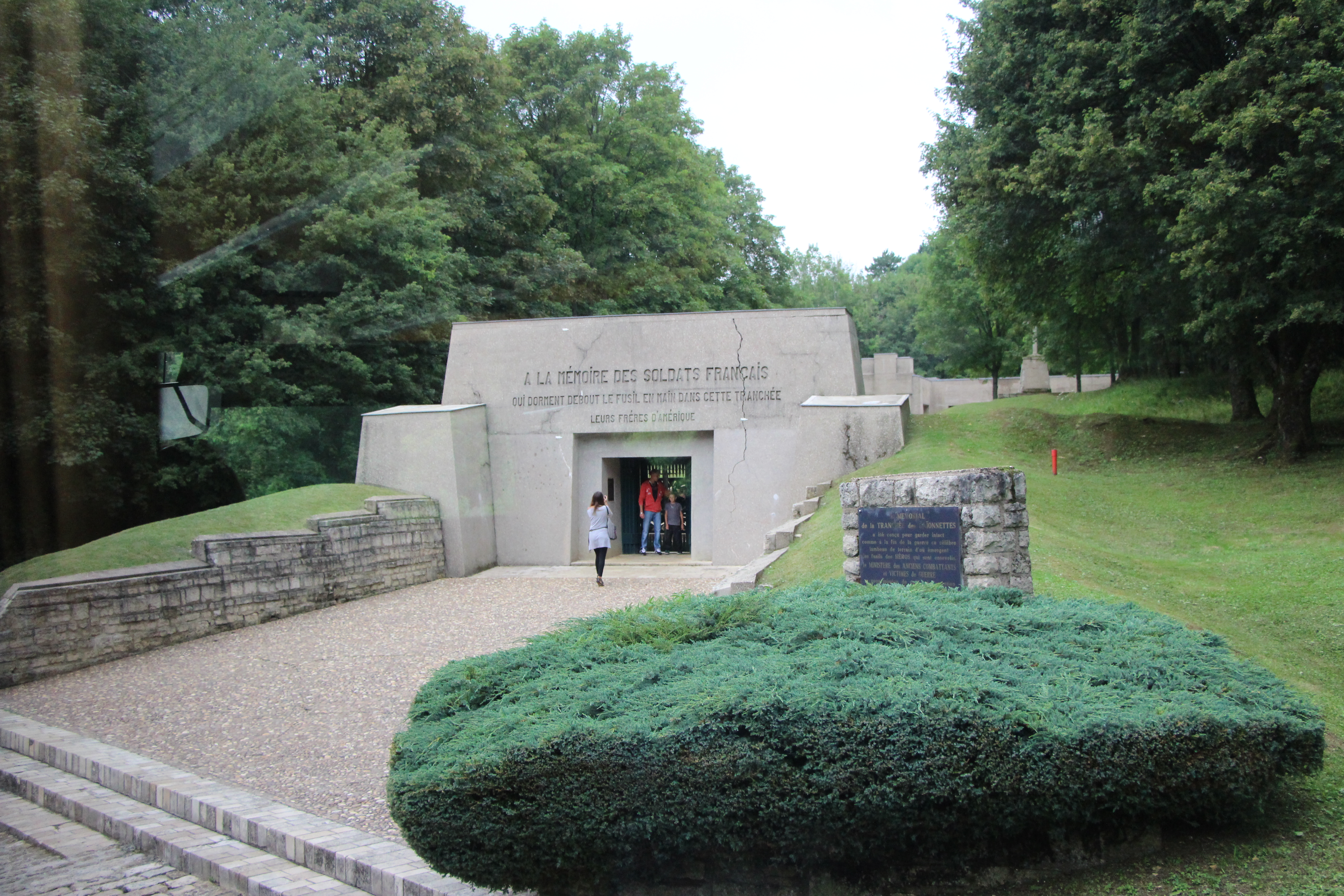
Entrance

== Battle of Verdun ==
The Battle of Verdun was the longest of the First World War. It began on 21 February 1916 with a German offensive designed to destroy the French army and end the war on the Western Front. The key objective was to capture the fortress city of Verdun by securing the heights to its east. Initial success saw the French Fort Douaumont captured but the battlefield afterwards turned into a quagmire and casualties were high on both sides. German forces achieved a second success in early June with the capture of Fort Vaux and attempted to continue the advance.

By 11 June the French 137th Infantry Regiment was posted to a defensive line west of Fort Douaumont between the Morchée wood and Thiaumont farm. The Ravin de la Dame, nicknamed "death ravine", lay to their rear. On 11 June the regiment was subjected to a German artillery bombardment and a series of infantry assaults. The regiment repelled three attacks but its 3rd Company and part of the 4th Company were left isolated, with the communicating trenches destroyed by shelling. By 12 June the 3rd Company had a strength of only 25 men when a renewed assault came and they were forced to surrender. The German forces buried the French dead in part of the trench, a standard practice during the war, and continued their advance. It is likely that they left the soldiers' rifles exposed to mark the location of the graves.

== Buried alive myth ==
In January 1919, after the war's end, the commander of the 137th Regiment, Colonel de Bonnefoy, visited the site. De Bonnefoy found the row of rifles still buried in the ground, though without any bayonets affixed. An investigation confirmed the presence of bodies beneath the rifles. Colonel de Bonnefoy had a wooden memorial erected and held a remembrance ceremony at the site. It afterwards became known as "Rifle Trench". Although the first edition of the Michelin Guide to Verdun, printed in 1919, did not mention it , a legend soon arose and later editions of the guide stated that the French soldiers had been buried alive on 11 June 1916 by the German bombardment and had died with their rifles (with fixed bayonets) still held upright, protruding above the ground.

The site was excavated by the French and the bodies of twenty-one French soldiers found. None of the bodies were found standing with rifle in hand and the position of the rifles was consistent with that of grave markers. The French were able to identify fourteen of the soldiers. Their bodies were buried at the nearby Fleury cemetery before being moved to the National Necropolis at Douaumont. The seven unidentified bodies were reburied in the trench and, their weapons having been lost, new rifles and bayonets with broken blades placed protruding from the graves next to the wooden crosses used as grave markers. The site soon became known as "Bayonet Trench". In 1929 French writer Jean Norton Cru claimed that the "Buried Alive" myth had been created by battlefield tourists. Men under bombardment were unlikely to be remain still in the trench, with their bayonets fixed, while gradually being buried during the shelling and even shells that detonated close to trenches were likely to cause a large portion of the trench wall to collapse rather than fill a trench like a grave.

== Memorial ==
American banker George F. Rand, president of Marine Trust Company, heard the story of the 137th Regiment at Verdun during his trip to Europe at the time of the 1919 Paris Peace Conference. He offered 500,000 francs to Georges Clemenceau for a memorial to be erected at the gravesite. Rand died the next day on 11 December 1919 in a plane crash near Croydon Field as he flew back to London on the first leg of his return journey to the United States.

It was the first permanent memorial erected on the Verdun battlefield. The structure was designed by architect André Ventre in concrete. It consists of a single roof slab supported by substantial pillars over the top of the trench and graves. The structure features a large concrete Latin cross. According to American historian Jay Winter, the minimalist memorial, characterized by its "austere avoidance of allegory, figurative art, and ornamentation", is a "war memorial of a special kind: a tomb frozen in time and preserved not by, but from art".

Access is by a wrought-iron entrance gate by former munitions designer Edgar Brandt. Brandt went on to design the bronze burner for the eternal flame that now forms the centrepiece of the Tomb of the Unknown Soldier in Paris.

The entrance is reached by an avenue of trees. The climb up the avenue is intended to recall the trenches used by soldiers moving to the front line from rear areas. Construction also included replacement of the original rifles, and preservation of the memorial placed by de Bonnefoy in 1919.

The memorial was unveiled by French president Alexandre Millerand on 8 December 1920. The ceremony was attended by the American ambassador to France, Hugh Campbell Wallace, Generals Joseph Joffre, Ferdinand Foch, and Philippe Pétain. An inscription at the memorial notes that it is dedicated to the "French soldiers who sleep on their feet, rifles in hand, in this trench". More recent plaques, installed by the Directorate for Heritage, Remembrance and Archives clarify that this is a myth, but it continues to proliferate.

The memorial was designated as a French National Heritage site in 1922. In March 2014 the French Ministry of the Armed Forces designated the Bayonet Trench and National Necropolis as one of the ten Major National Remembrance Sites. On September 20, 2023, it was inscribed on UNESCO's World Heritage List at the 45th session of the World Heritage Committee, along with 139 other funerary and memory sites of the First World War in the Western Front.
