= Albert Gill =

Recipient of the Victoria Cross

- Born: 8 September 1879; Birmingham, Warwickshire, England
- Died: 27 July 1916 (aged 36); Delville Wood, France
- Burial place: Delville Wood Commonwealth War Graves Commission Cemetery
- Military career
- Allegiance: United Kingdom
- Branch: British Army
- Rank: Sergeant
- Service number: 2815
- Units: King's Royal Rifle Corps
- Conflicts: World War I: Battle of the Somme; Battle of Delville Wood †
- Awards: Victoria Cross

Sergeant Albert Gill VC (8 September 1879 – 27 July 1916) was an English recipient of the Victoria Cross, the highest and most prestigious award for gallantry in the face of the enemy that can be awarded to British and Commonwealth forces.

Gill was born in Birmingham, then in Warwickshire, and was employed as a postal worker with the GPO.

== Battle of Delville Wood ==
Gill was 36 years old, and a sergeant in the 1st Battalion, The King's Royal Rifle Corps, British Army during the First World War when the following deed took place for which he was awarded the VC:

On 27 July 1916 at Battle of Delville Wood on the Somme, France, the enemy made a very strong counterattack on the right flank of the battalion and rushed the bombing post after killing all the company bombers. Sergeant Gill rallied the remnants of his platoon, none of whom were skilled bombers, and reorganised his defences. Soon afterwards the enemy nearly surrounded his men and started sniping at about 20 yards range. Although it was almost certain death, Sergeant Gill stood boldly up in order to direct the fire of his men. He was killed almost at once, but his gallant action held up the enemy advance.

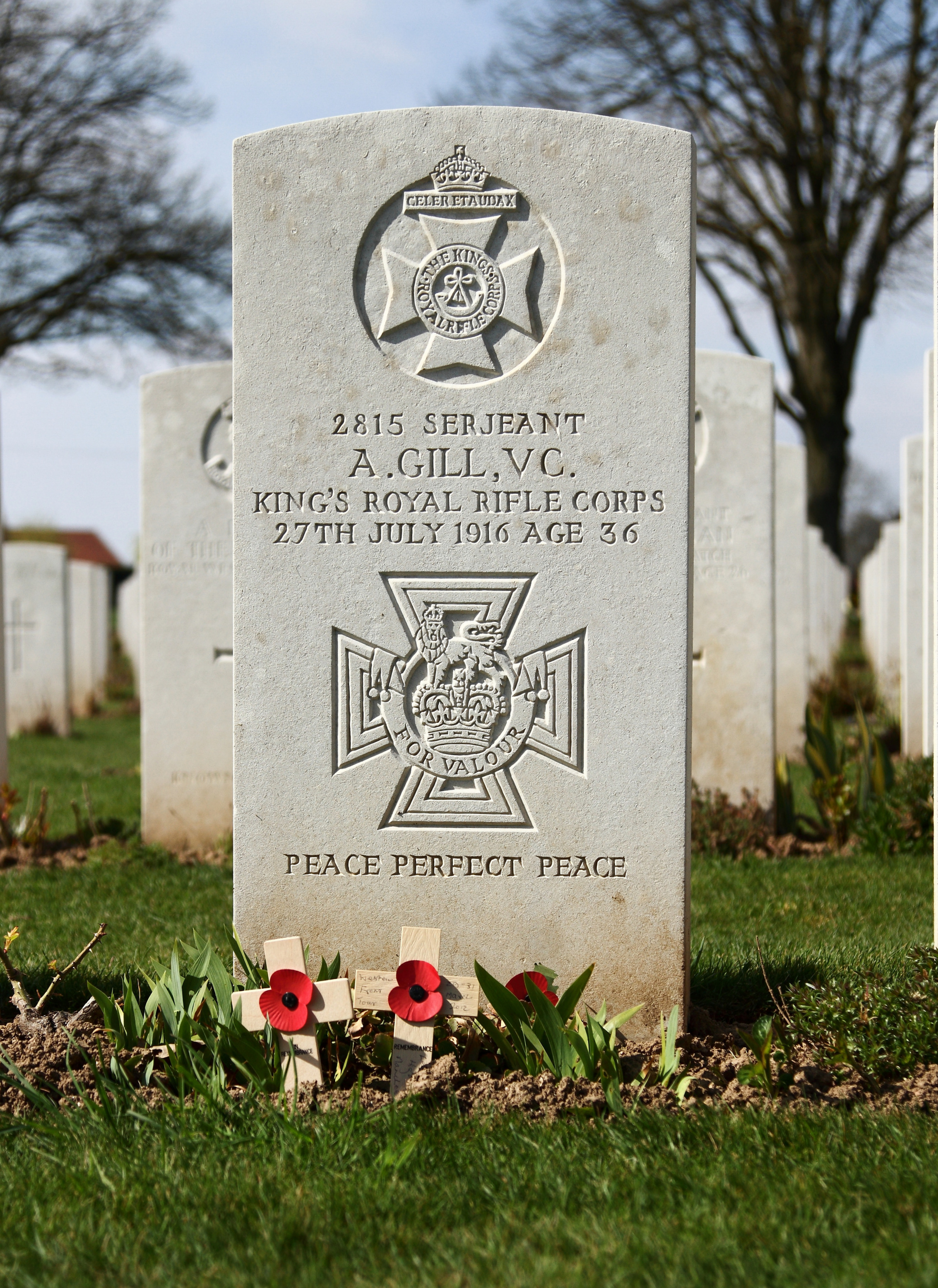
Albert Gill's grave at Delville Wood Cemetery

Gill is buried at Delville Wood Commonwealth War Graves Commission Cemetery, Somme, France.

== The Medal ==
Gill's Victoria Cross is in the Lord Ashcroft VC Collection at the Imperial War Museum.

== Memorials ==
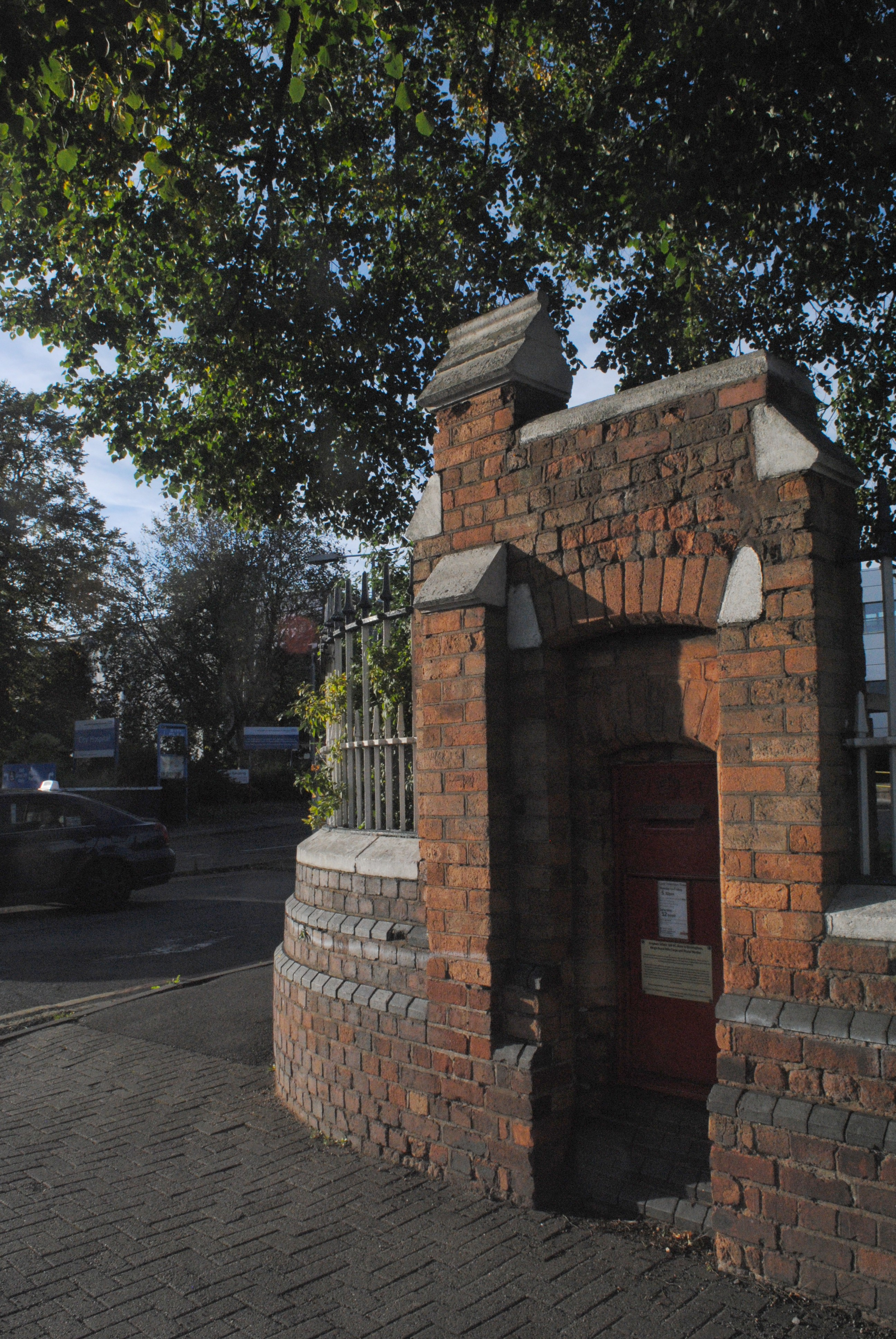
Post box B66 52

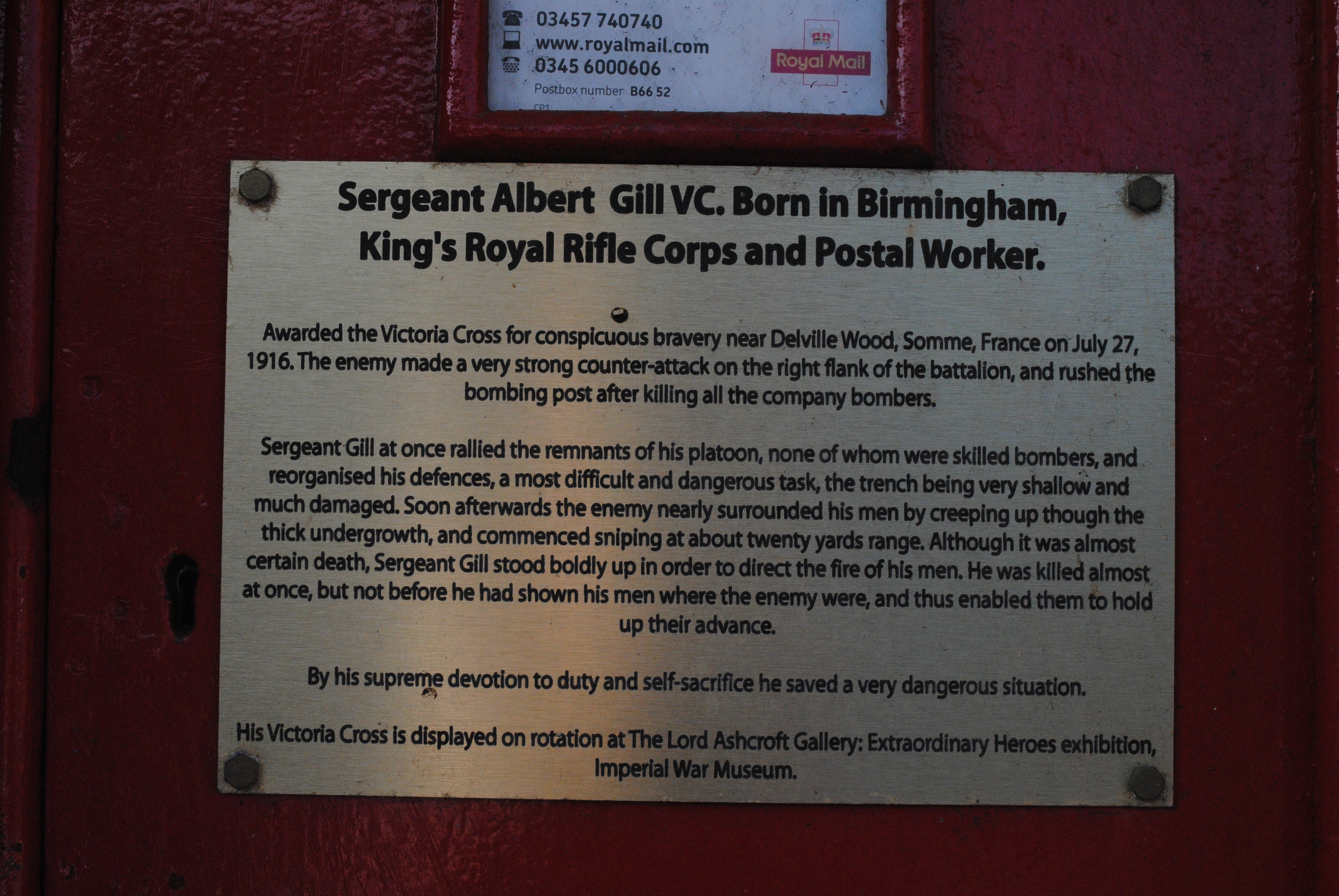
Plaque on post box B66 52

Gill is commemorated by a plaque attached to post box B66 52, a Victorian-era wall post box, outside City Hospital in Birmingham, England.

== Bibliography ==
- Gliddon, Gerald (2011) [1991]. Somme 1916. VCs of the First World War. The History Press. ISBN 978-0-7524-6303-2.
