= Larch Wood (Railway Cutting) Cemetery =

WWI CWGC cemetery in Ypres, Belgium

Larch Wood (Railway Cutting)
- Commonwealth War Graves Commission
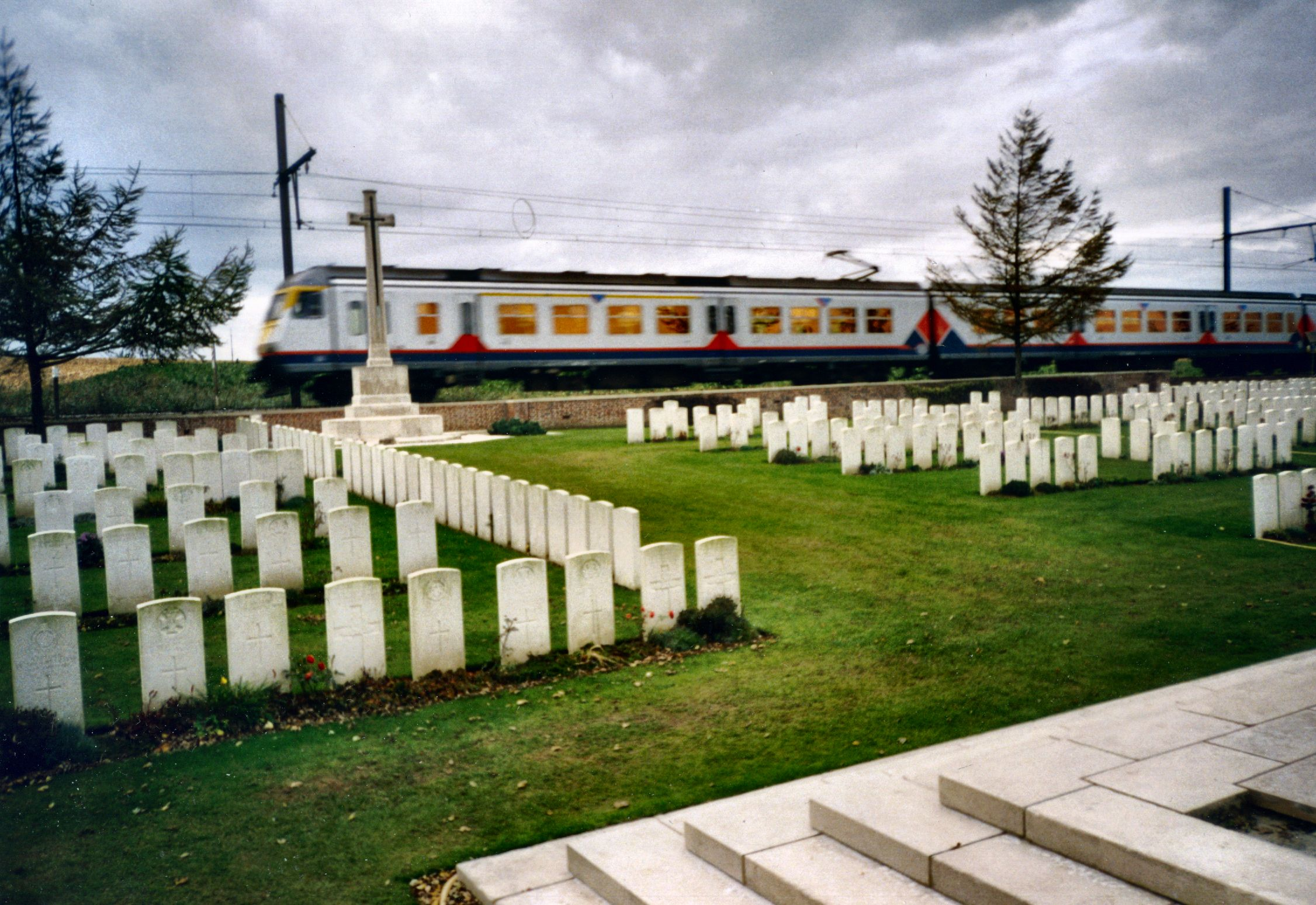
- Used for those deceased April 1915 – April 1918
- Established: 1915
- Location: 50°49′40″N 02°55′24″E near Ypres, West Flanders, Belgium
- Designed by: Sir Edwin Lutyens
- Total burials: 857
- Unknowns: 33

Burials by nation
- Allied Powers: United Kingdom: 701; Canada: 86; Australia: 36; British West Indies: 1

Burials by war
- World War I: 857

UNESCO World Heritage Site
- Official name: Funerary and memory sites of the First World War (Western Front)
- Type: Cultural
- Criteria: i, ii, vi
- Designated: 2023 (45th session)
- Reference no.: 1567-FL19

Larch Wood (Railway Cutting) Cemetery is a Commonwealth War Graves Commission (CWGC) burial ground for the dead of the First World War located in the Ypres Salient on the Western Front in Belgium.

The cemetery grounds were assigned to the United Kingdom in perpetuity by King Albert I of the Belgians in recognition of the sacrifices made by the British Empire in the defence and liberation of Belgium during the war.

== Foundation ==
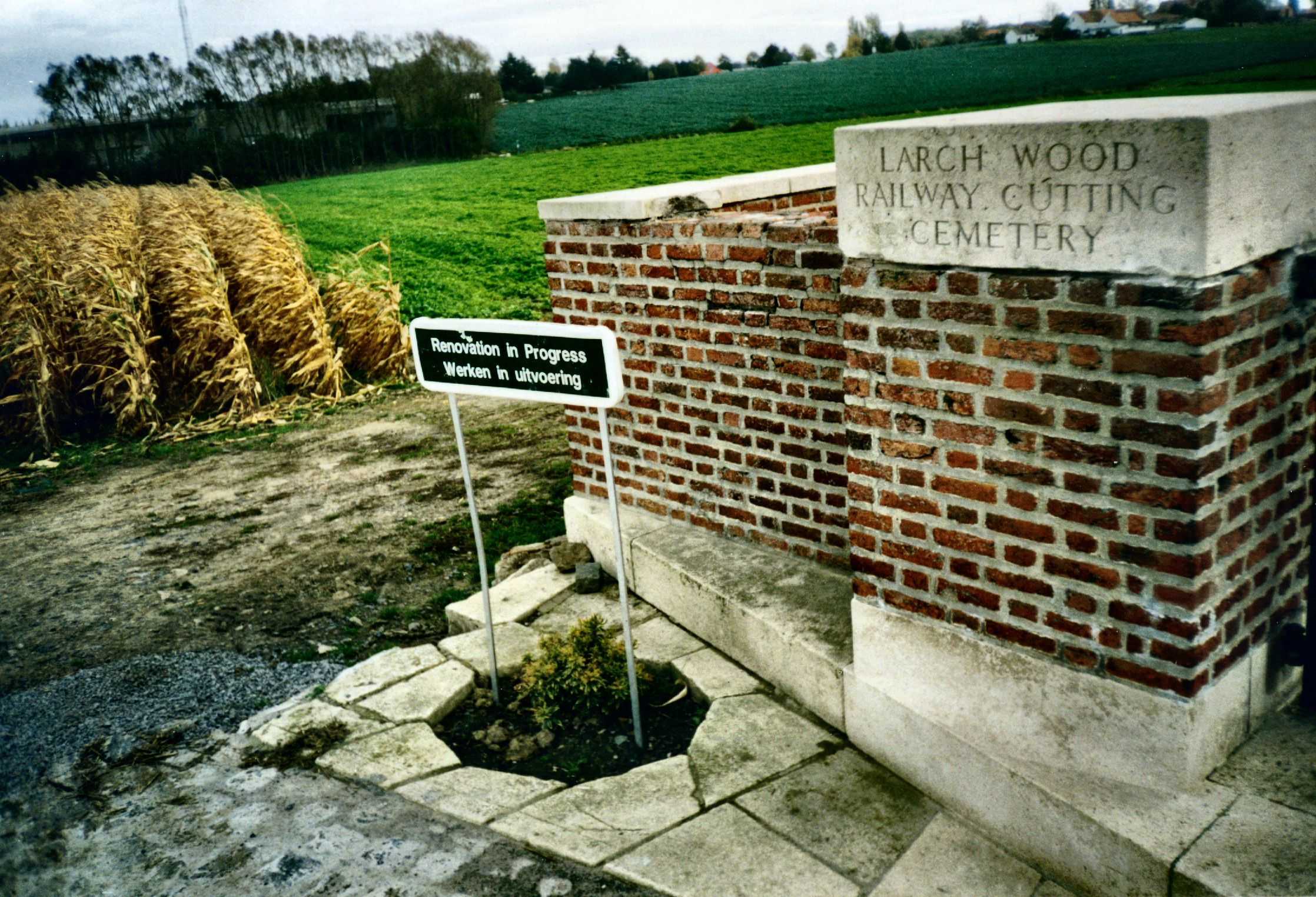
The entrance to the cemetery.

The cemetery was founded by Commonwealth troops in April 1915 and remained in use until April 1918, when the Western Front had moved away from the area. Most of the dead are from the defence of the nearby Hill 60.

After the Armistice, the cemetery was enlarged with the concentration of graves from the battlefield, smaller cemeteries in the area (Brussels General, Ghistelles Churchyard, Oudenburg Churchyard, Wervik Communal) and Commonwealth troops buried in from German war cemeteries (America Cross Roads, Kortemark, Eernegem, Groenenberg, Handzaame, Ichtegem, Leffinghe, Marckhove, Tenbrielen Communal, Tourhout No 2, Vladsloo, Warneton Sud-et-Bas, Wijnendaele, Zantvoorde).

The graves of 86 people are defined as "special memorials" — that is, they are either recorded as being buried here but the CWGC was unable to find proof (headstones marked "Believed to be buried in this cemetery") or they are known to be buried here but their exact location was lost or destroyed by later fighting (headstones marked "Known to be buried in this cemetery"). These graves all carry (unless replaced by a personalised family message) the inscription at the foot of the stone "Their Glory Shall Not Be Blotted Out" - a line from Sirach 44:13 suggested by Rudyard Kipling.

The cemetery was designed by Sir Edwin Lutyens who was also responsible for the Cenotaph in Whitehall, London and the Thiepval Memorial on the Somme, France.

== Notable graves ==
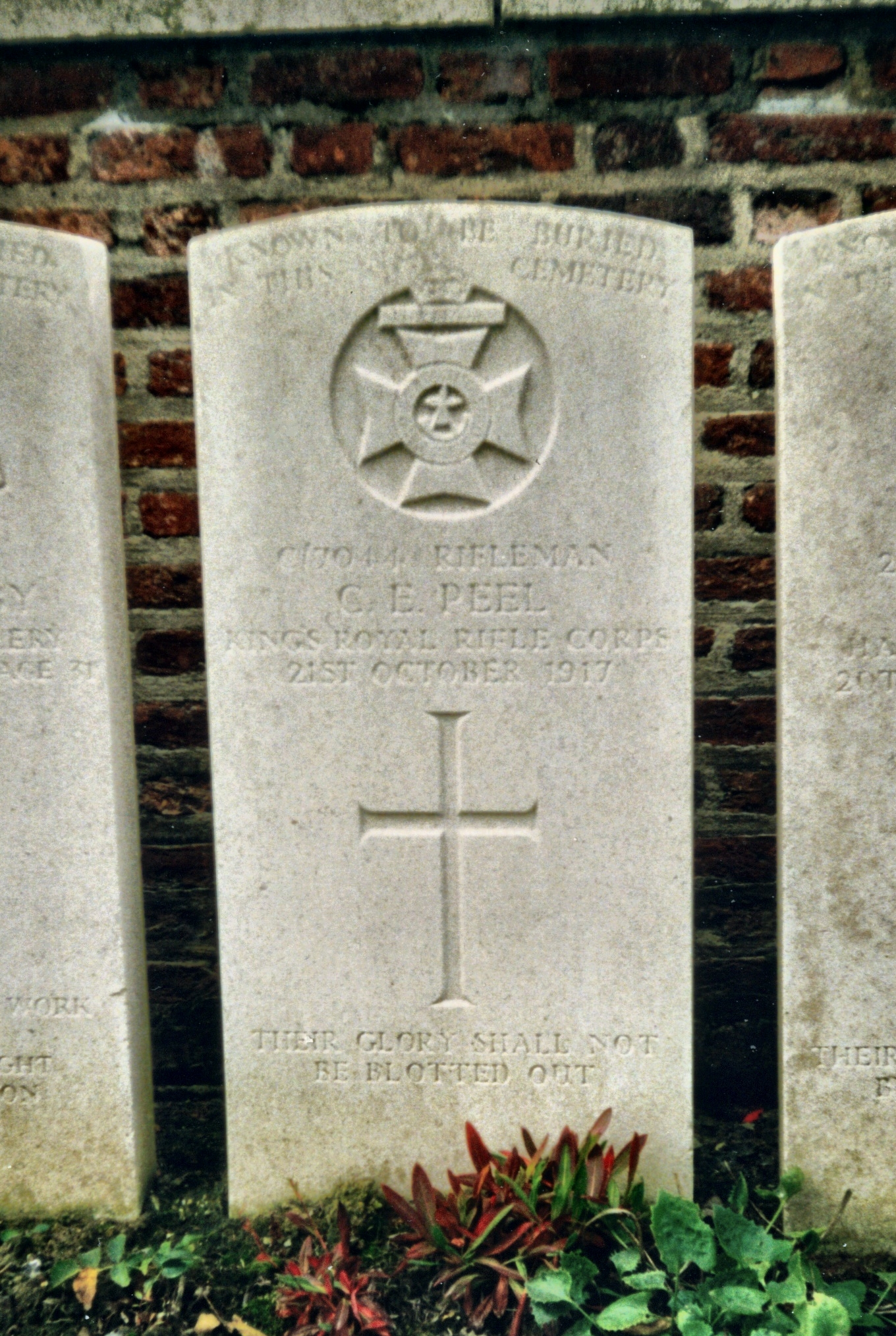
C/7044 Rifleman C.E. Peel of the 18th Battalion, King's Royal Rifle Corps.

The cemetery contains the graves of over 850 soldiers. Amongst these is the grave of Rifleman Clarence Eastwood Peel, who was killed in the area on 21 October 1917. Clarence Peel was the maternal uncle of modern-day playwright Alan Bennett. Bennett has detailed his search for both the grave and the life story of his uncle in the radio monologue "Uncle Clarence". Lieutenant John Eden, older brother of the 1st Earl of Avon, the former British Prime Minister, is also buried in the cemetery.
