= Lone Tree Commonwealth War Graves Commission Cemetery =

WWI CWGC cemetery in Ypres, Belgium

Lone Tree
- Commonwealth War Graves Commission
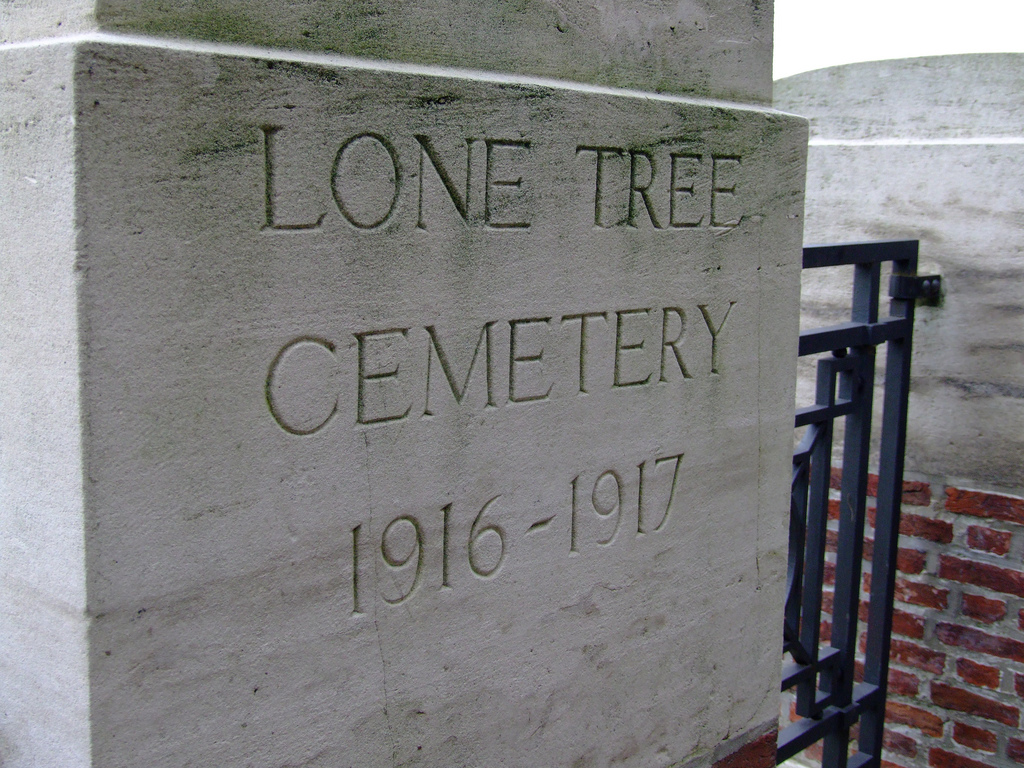
- Used for those deceased 1916–1918
- Established: 1917
- Location: 50°46′29″N 02°51′42″E near Wijtschate, Heuvelland, Belgium
- Designed by: JR Truelove
- Total burials: 88
- Unknowns: 9

Burials by nation
- Allied Powers: United Kingdom 88

Burials by war
- World War I: 88

UNESCO World Heritage Site
- Official name: Funerary and memory sites of the First World War (Western Front)
- Type: Cultural
- Criteria: i, ii, vi
- Designated: 2023 (45th session)
- Reference no.: 1567-FL25

Lone Tree Cemetery is a Commonwealth War Graves Commission (CWGC) burial ground for the dead of the First World War located in the Ypres Salient on the Western Front in Belgium. It is located at Spanbroekmolen, on one of the highest points of the Messines Ridge.

== Foundation ==
Like the Spanbroekmolen cemetery nearby, Lone Tree Cemetery was established in 1917 at the start of the Battle of Messines. Most of the burials are of men from the Royal Irish Rifles 36th (Ulster) Division who died on the first day of the battle. Most graves are of soldiers who went "over the top" early in the morning of 7 June 1917.

Some of the men buried here were actually killed by the explosion of the mine placed by the British Royal Engineers under Lone Tree hill at Spanbroekmolen, which was blown around 15 seconds later than planned. The Spanbroekmolen mine formed part of a series of mines under the German lines. It was charged with 91,000 pounds (41,000 kg) of ammonal and set 88 feet (27 m) below ground, at the end of a gallery 1,710 feet (520 m) long. When detonated on 7 June 1917, its blast formed the "Lone Tree Crater" with a diameter of 250 feet (76 m) and a depth of 40 feet (12 m). The crater at Lone Tree was acquired in 1929 by the Toc H foundation in Poperinge, today recognised as the Pool of Peace memorial.

The cemetery was designed by J. R. Truelove. The cemetery grounds were assigned to the United Kingdom in perpetuity by King Albert I of Belgium in recognition of the sacrifices made by the British Empire in the defence and liberation of Belgium during the war.
