= Delville Wood Cemetery =

WWI CWGC site in Somme, France

Delville wood cemetery
- Commonwealth War Graves Commission
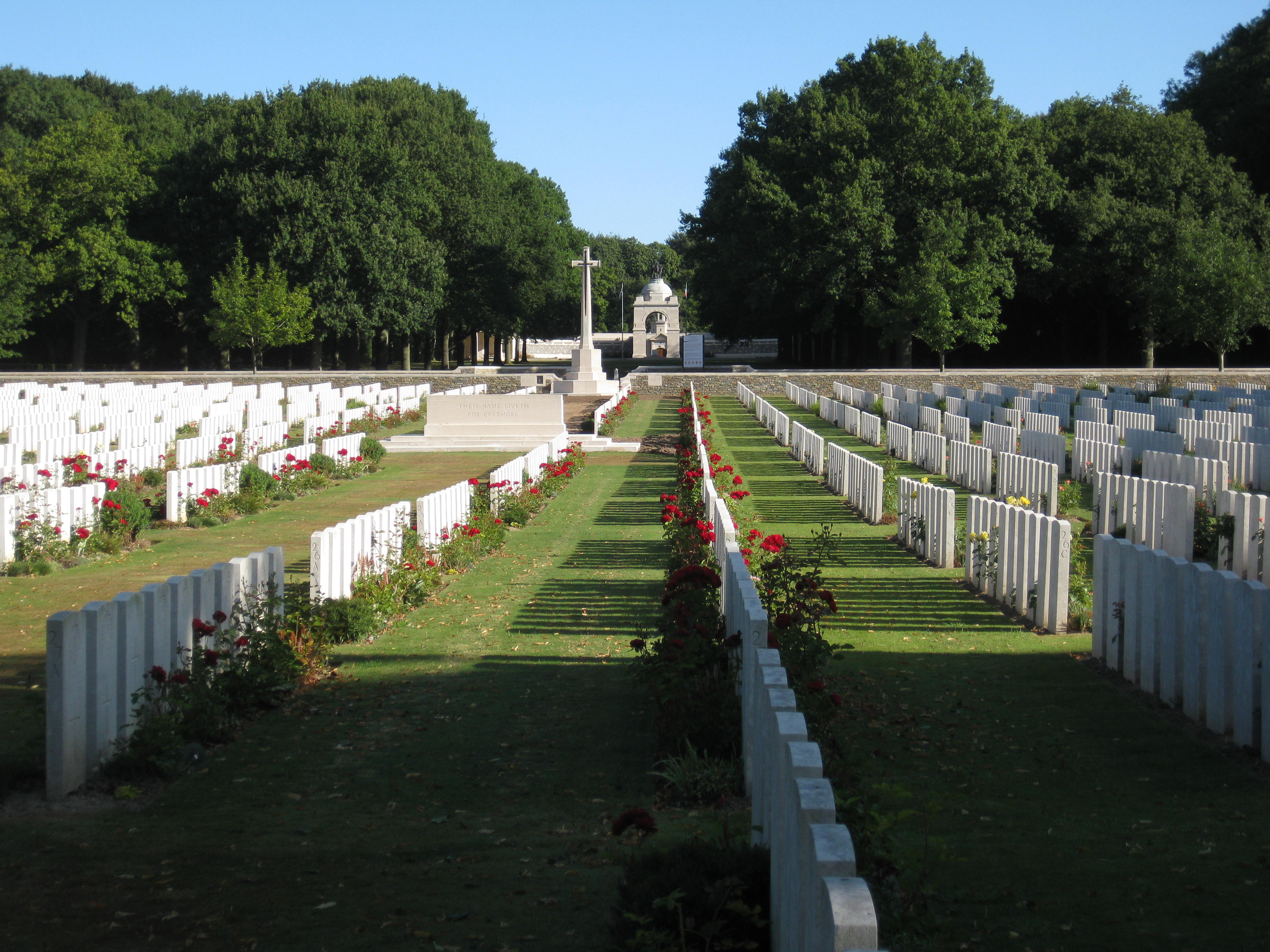
- Delville Wood Commonwealth War Graves Commission cemetery
- Used for those deceased Sep 1914 – Oct 1918
- Established: Concentration cemetery. 1920 onwards
- Location: 50°1′31″N 2°48′46″E near Longueval, Somme, France
- Total burials: 5,523
- Unknowns: 3,593
- Commemorated: 27

Burials by nation
- Allied Powers: United Kingdom: 5,242; South Africa: 152; Australia: 81; Canada: 29; New Zealand: 19

Burials by war
- World War I: 5,523

UNESCO World Heritage Site
- Official name: Funerary and memory sites of the First World War (Western Front)
- Type: Cultural
- Criteria: i, ii, vi
- Designated: 2023 (45th session)
- Reference no.: 1567-SE05

Delville Wood Cemetery is a Commonwealth War Graves Commission cemetery located near Longueval, France and the third largest in the Somme battlefield area.

== Overview ==
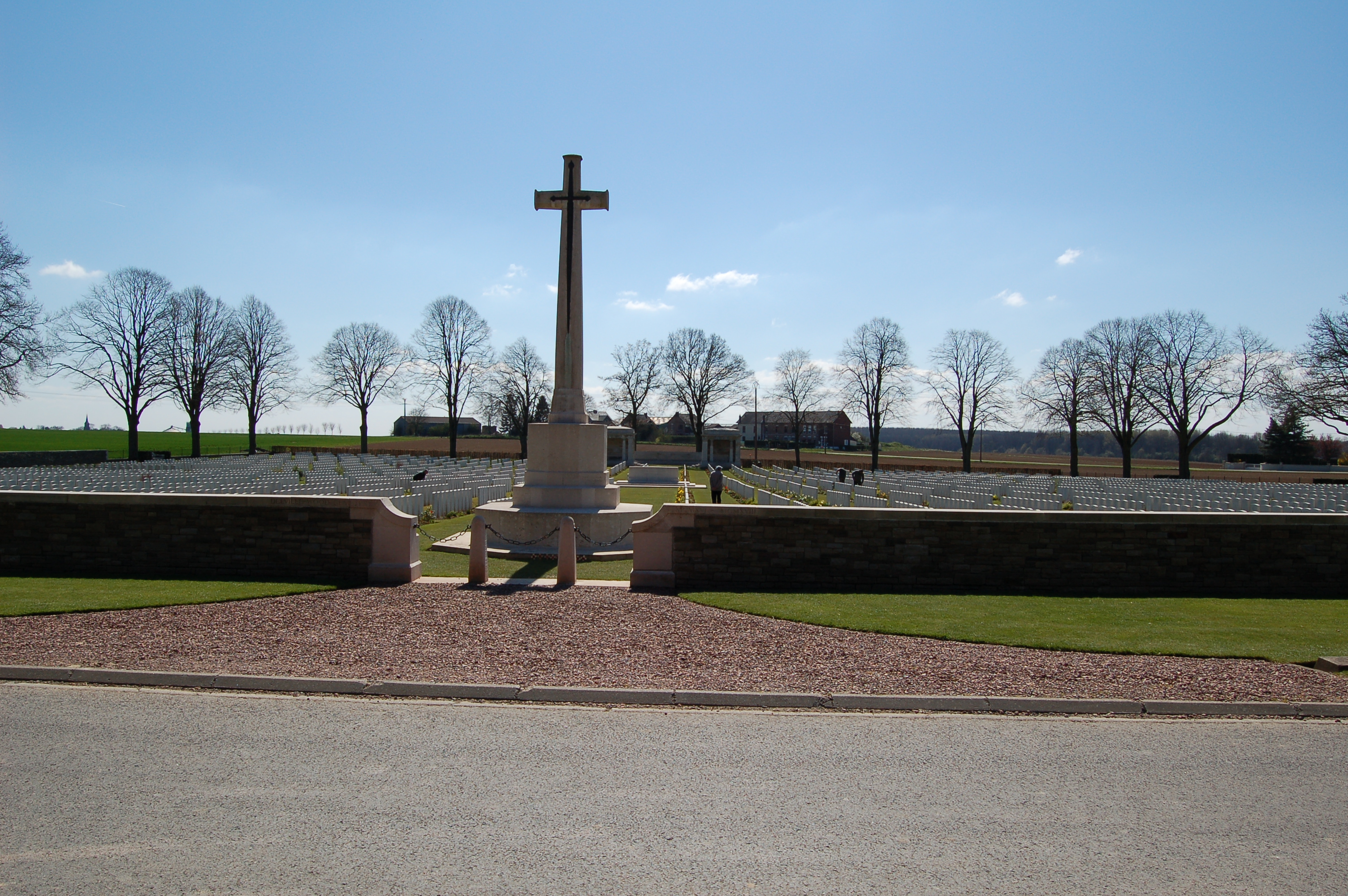
Another view of the cemetery

Sited opposite the Delville Wood South African Memorial and designed by Sir Herbert Baker, Delville Wood cemetery is located just off the D20 that runs between Longueval and Guillemont (11 km east of Albert), France and contains 5,523 burials of which two-thirds are unknown.

The cemetery was constructed after the Armistice and mainly contains bodies recovered from the battlefields. A smaller number of graves were moved in from nearby French and German cemeteries.

Almost all of the casualties date from July-September 1916 and are from the various Battles of Delville Wood. The high proportion of unknown graves probably reflects lengthy period which elapsed before many of the bodies were removed from the battlefield and buried.

=== German ===
The German cemeteries from which remains were moved were:

- Bazentin-Le-Petit German Cemetery, from which were taken five British soldiers killed in March/April 1918.
- Courcelette Communal Cemetery German Extension contained the remains of three British and one Canadian soldier, as well as 1,040 German soldiers. Three of the four Commonwealth graves had been destroyed by artillery fire, and so Delville Wood Cemetery contains special memorials to these three soldiers.
- Guillemont German Cemetery No. 1, in which were buried 7 British soldiers killed between May and July 1918 in addition to 221 German soldiers.
- Maricourt (De La Cote) German Cemetery, from which were moved the five British soldiers and airmen which had been buried in it
- Martinpuich German Cemetery No. 1, contained the remains of one British sailor and six soldiers, all killed in March 1918;
- Martinpuich German Cemetery No. 2, contained the grave of one British soldier.

=== Allied ===
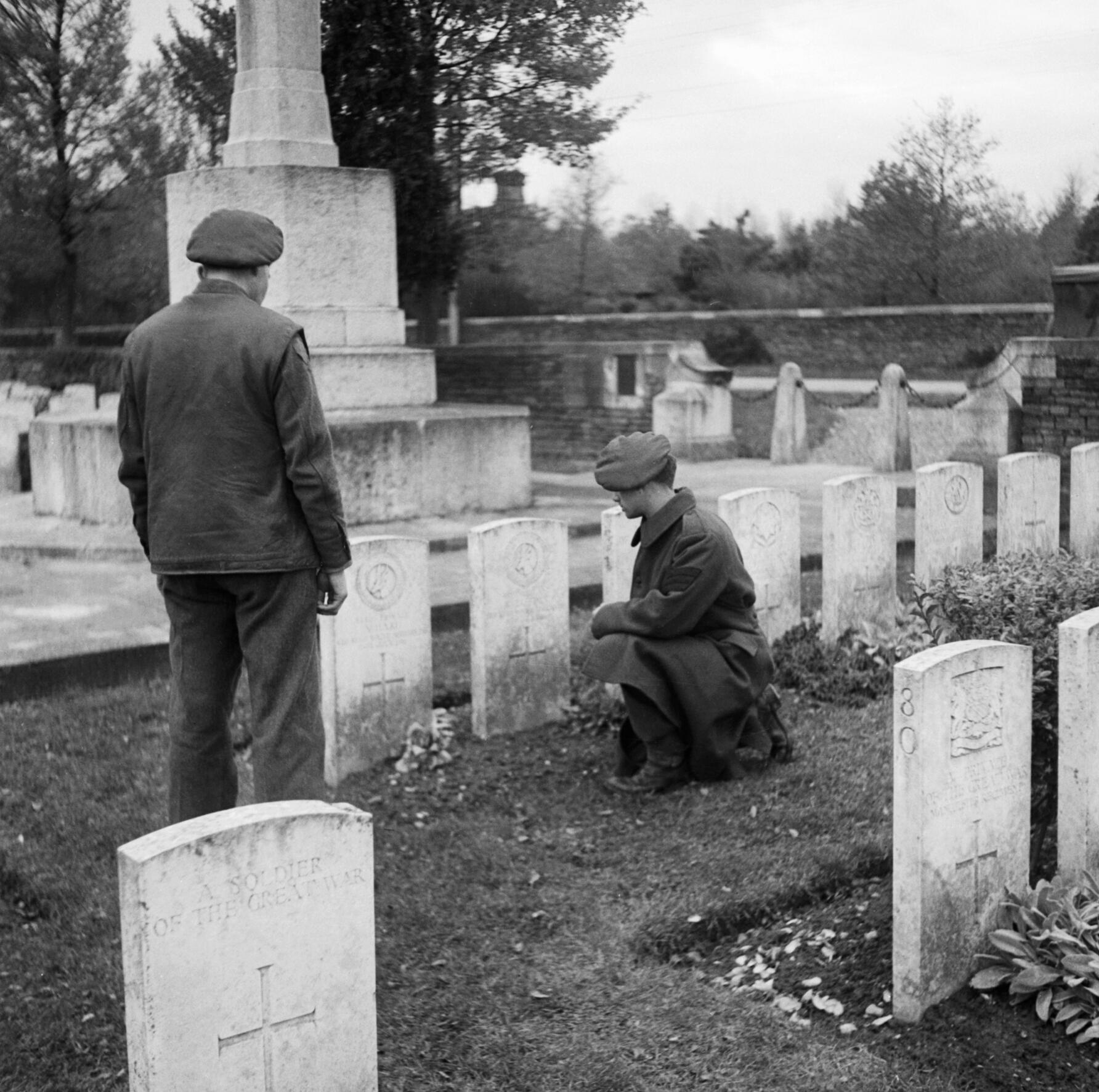
Soldiers inspect graves at the South African First World War cemetery at Delville Wood, 13 November 1944

Allied cemeteries from which remains were moved were:

- Angle Wood Cemetery, Ginchy, in which 27 British soldiers, largely London Regiment, were buried in an "excavated shell-hole" in Angle Wood
- Battery Copse Cemetery, Curlu contained 17 British graves as well as French graves.
- Ferme-Rouge French Military Cemetery, near to Battery Copse Cemetery contained one British soldier killed in March, 1917;

The cemetery contains special memorials to the 27 casualties believed to be buried amongst the 3,593 unidentified burials.

Sergeant Albert Gill, of the 1st Battalion King's Royal Rifle Corps, is buried in the cemetery. He was killed on 27 July 1916 during the fighting in Delville Wood whilst standing up under fire to direct his troops, an act for which he was awarded the Victoria Cross.

Three bodies found during the building of the Delville Wood South African Memorial opposite the cemetery were interred in it in 1984.
