= Spanbroekmolen British Cemetery =

WWI CWGC cemetery in Ypres, Belgium

- Commonwealth War Graves Commission
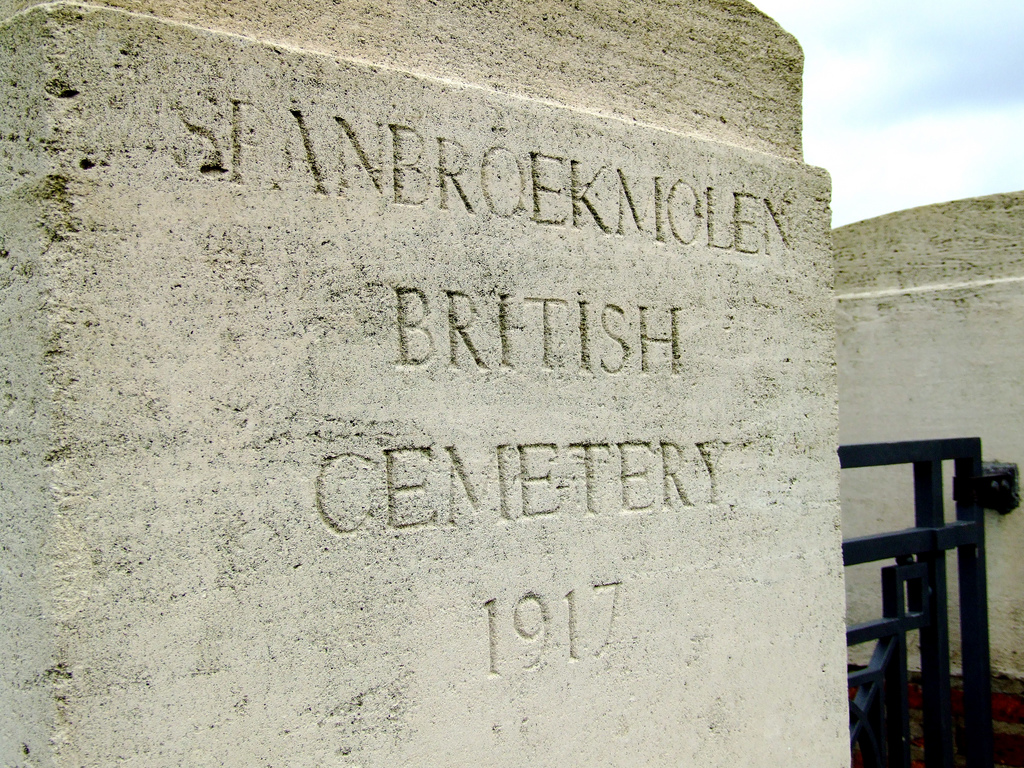
- Used for those deceased 1917
- Established: 1917
- Location: 50°46′43″N 02°52′01″E near Wijtschate, Heuvelland, Belgium
- Designed by: J R Truelove
- Total burials: 58

Burials by nation
- Allied Powers: United Kingdom 58

Burials by war
- World War I: 58

UNESCO World Heritage Site
- Official name: Funerary and memory sites of the First World War (Western Front)
- Type: Cultural
- Criteria: i, ii, vi
- Designated: 2023 (45th session)
- Reference no.: 1567-FL24
- Statistics source: and CWGC

Spanbroekmolen British Cemetery is a Commonwealth War Graves Commission (CWGC) burial ground for the dead of the First World War located in the Ypres Salient on the Western Front in Belgium. It is located at Spanbroekmolen, on one of the highest points of the Messines Ridge.

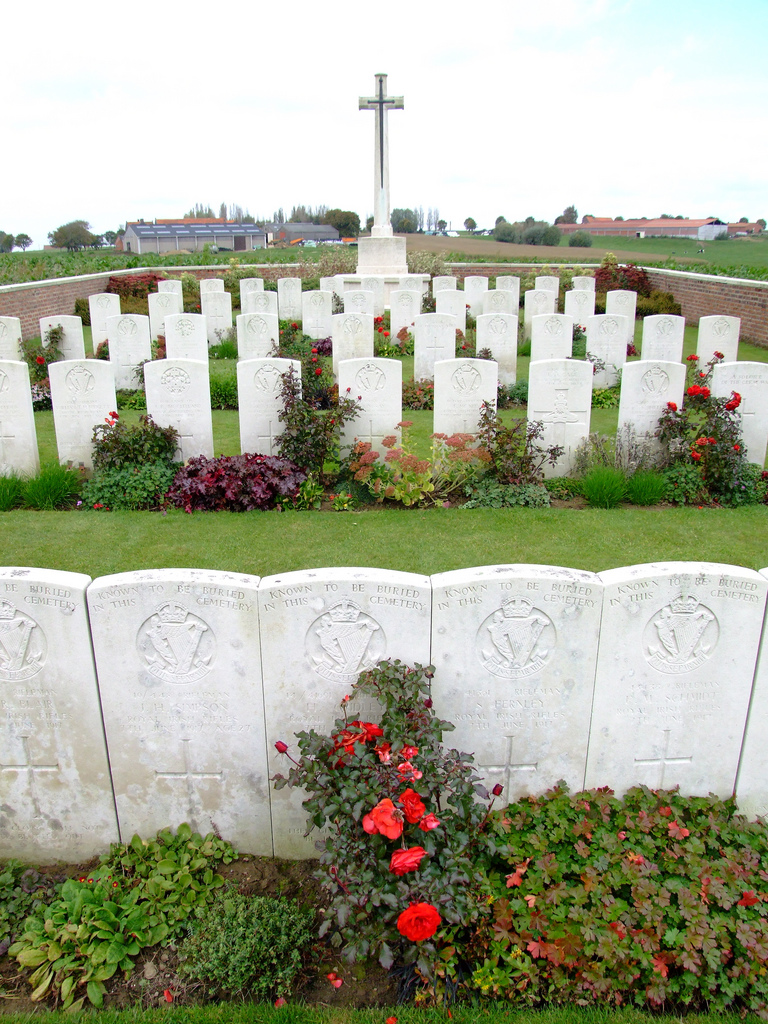
Graves in Spanbroekmolen British cemetery

== Foundation ==
The cemetery, named after a nearby windmill, was established in summer 1917. It mainly contains burials from the first day of the Battle of Messines, plus one from the day after. As in Lone Tree War Cemetery nearby, many of those buried here were from the 36th (Ulster) Division.

The cemetery was destroyed in later fighting and was reconstructed after the Armistice. Six graves could not be located and a "special memorial" notes the names of the men whose graves were not found.

Some of the men buried here were killed by the force of the explosion of a mine placed by the British Royal Engineers. The mine at Spanbroekmolen, which formed part of a series of mines under the German lines, was charged with 91,000 pounds (41,000 kg) of ammonal and set 88 feet (27 m) below ground, at the end of a gallery 1,710 feet (520 m) long. When detonated around 15 seconds later than planned at the start of the battle on 7 June 1917, its blast formed a crater with a diameter of 250 feet (76 m) and a depth of 40 feet (12 m), destroying the German trenches and throwing communications into turmoil. The explosion crater, now filled with water, still exists and is called "Spanbroekmolenkrater" or "Lone Tree Crater". It was acquired in 1929 by the Toc H foundation in Poperinge, today recognised as the "Pool of Peace".

The cemetery was designed by J. R. Truelove. The cemetery grounds were assigned to the United Kingdom in perpetuity by King Albert I of Belgium in recognition of the sacrifices made by the British Empire in the defence and liberation of Belgium during the war.

== Bibliography ==
- Edmonds, J. E. (1991) [1948]. Military Operations France and Belgium, 1917: 7 June – 10 November: Messines and Third Ypres (Passchendaele). History of the Great War Based on Official Documents by Direction of the Historical Section of the Committee of Imperial Defence. Vol. II (Imperial War Museum and Battery Press ed.). London: HMSO. ISBN 0-89839-166-0.
- Holt, Tonie; Holt, Valmai (2014) [1997]. Major & Mrs Holt's Battlefield Guide to the Ypres Salient & Passchendaele. Barnsley: Pen & Sword Books. ISBN 978-0-85052-551-9.
