= Ploegsteert Wood Military Cemetery =

WWI CWGC cemetery in Belgium

- Commonwealth War Graves Commission
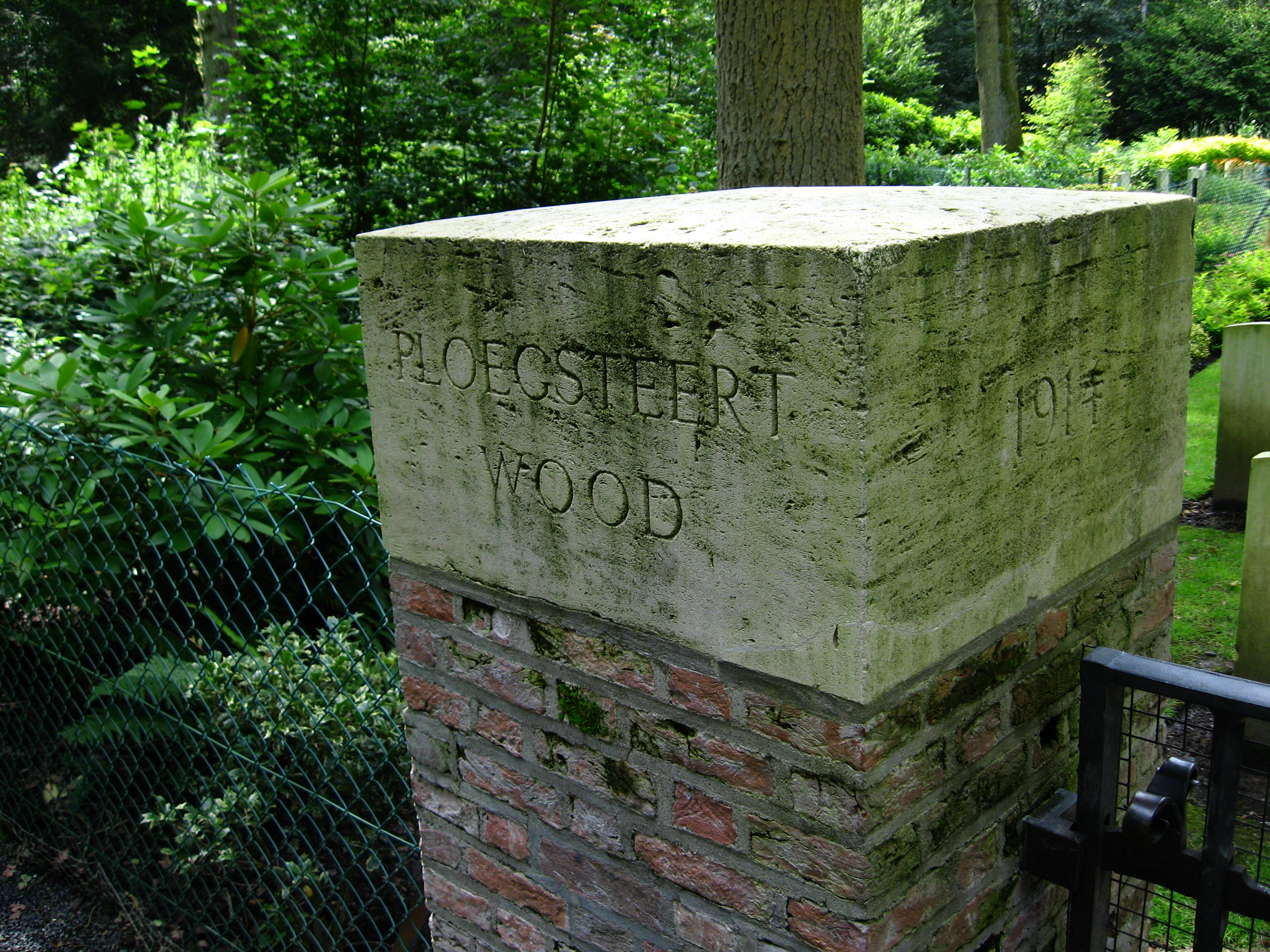
- Used for those deceased 1914–1918
- Established: 1914
- Location: 50°44′13″N 02°53′59″E near Ploegsteert, West Flanders, Belgium
- Designed by: W H Cowlishaw
- Total burials: 164
- Unknowns: 1

Burials by nation
- Allied Powers: United Kingdom 117; Canada: 28; New Zealand: 18; Australia: 1

Burials by war
- World War I: 164

UNESCO World Heritage Site
- Official name: Funerary and memory sites of the First World War (Western Front)
- Type: Cultural
- Criteria: i, ii, vi
- Designated: 2023 (45th session)
- Reference no.: 1567-WA15
- Statistics source: WW1Cemeteries.com and CWGC

Ploegsteert Wood Military Cemetery is a Commonwealth War Graves Commission (CWGC) burial ground for the dead of the First World War located in the Ypres Salient within Ploegsteert Wood on the Western Front in Belgium. The cemetery grounds were assigned to the United Kingdom in perpetuity by King Albert I of Belgium in recognition of the sacrifices made by the British Empire in the defence and liberation of Belgium during the war.

== Foundation ==
The cemetery was founded by enclosing a number of small cemeteries made by individual regiments. The grounds were established in December 1914 as the "Somerset Light Infantry Cemetery", expanding in April 1915 when the "Bucks Cemetery" was started by the Oxfordshire and Buckinghamshire Light Infantry

A further cemetery was established by the Gloucesters and the Loyal North Lancs regiments in October 1915, named "Canadian Cemetery, Strand" after its 28 Canadian graves and the nearby Strand trench. The cemetery was used by New Zealanders in 1917.

It fell into German hands on 10 April 1918 and remained occupied until 29 September, when the Hundred Days Offensive swept fighting out of the Salient.

The cemetery was designed by W H Cowlishaw.
