= Mud Corner Cemetery =

WWI CWGC cemetery in Ypres, Belgium

Mud Corner
- Commonwealth War Graves Commission
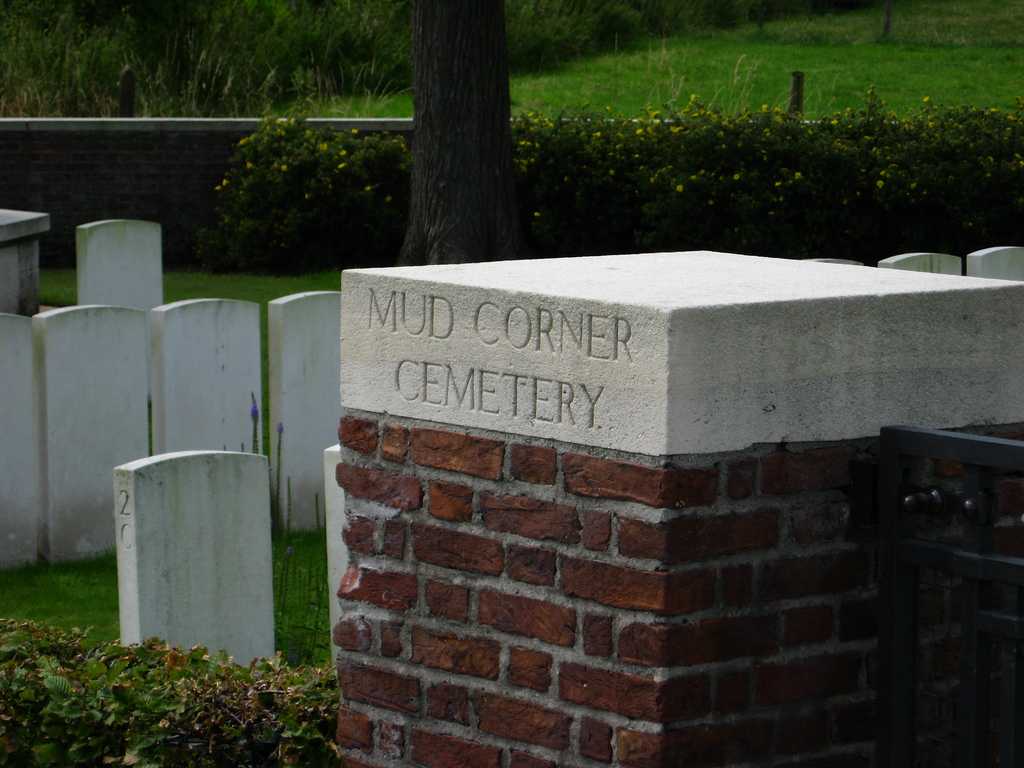
- Used for those deceased June–December 1917
- Established: 1917
- Location: 50°44′32″N 02°53′53″E near Ploegsteert, Belgium
- Designed by: G H Goldsmith
- Total burials: 85
- Unknowns: 2

Burials by nation
- Allied Powers: New Zealand: 53; Australia: 31; United Kingdom: 1

Burials by war
- World War I: 85

UNESCO World Heritage Site
- Official name: Funerary and memory sites of the First World War (Western Front)
- Type: Cultural
- Criteria: i, ii, vi
- Designated: 2023 (45th session)
- Reference no.: 1567-WA13
- Statistics source: WW1Cemeteries.com and CWGC

Mud Corner Cemetery is a Commonwealth War Graves Commission burial ground for the dead of the First World War located near Ypres, on the Western Front. The cemetery grounds were assigned to the United Kingdom in perpetuity by King Albert I of Belgium in recognition of the sacrifices made by the British Empire in the defence and liberation of Belgium during the war.

== Foundation ==
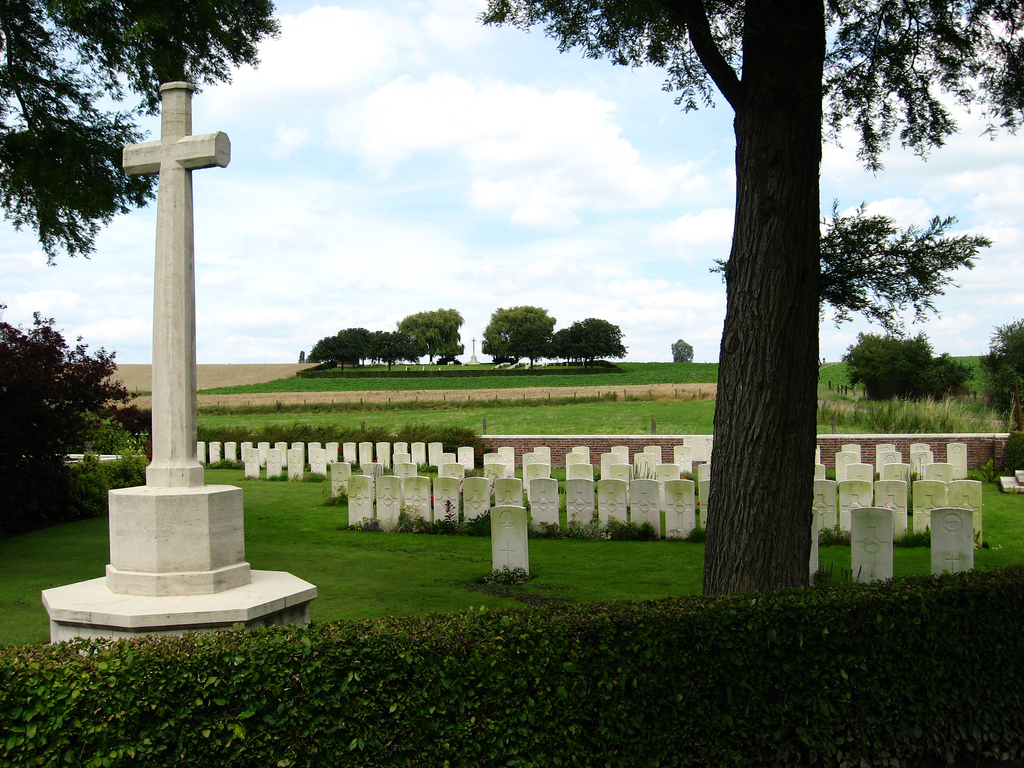
Mud Corner cemetery showing the war cross. The site is too small to have a war stone.

The cemetery, near Ploegsteert ("Plug Street" to the common soldier of the time), is one of the smaller of the 23000 cemeteries maintained by the Commonwealth War Graves Commission, with just 85 graves. They date from the outbreak of the Battle of Messines.
