= Buffs Road Cemetery =

WWI CWGC cemetery in Ypres, Belgium

Buffs Road
- Commonwealth War Graves Commission
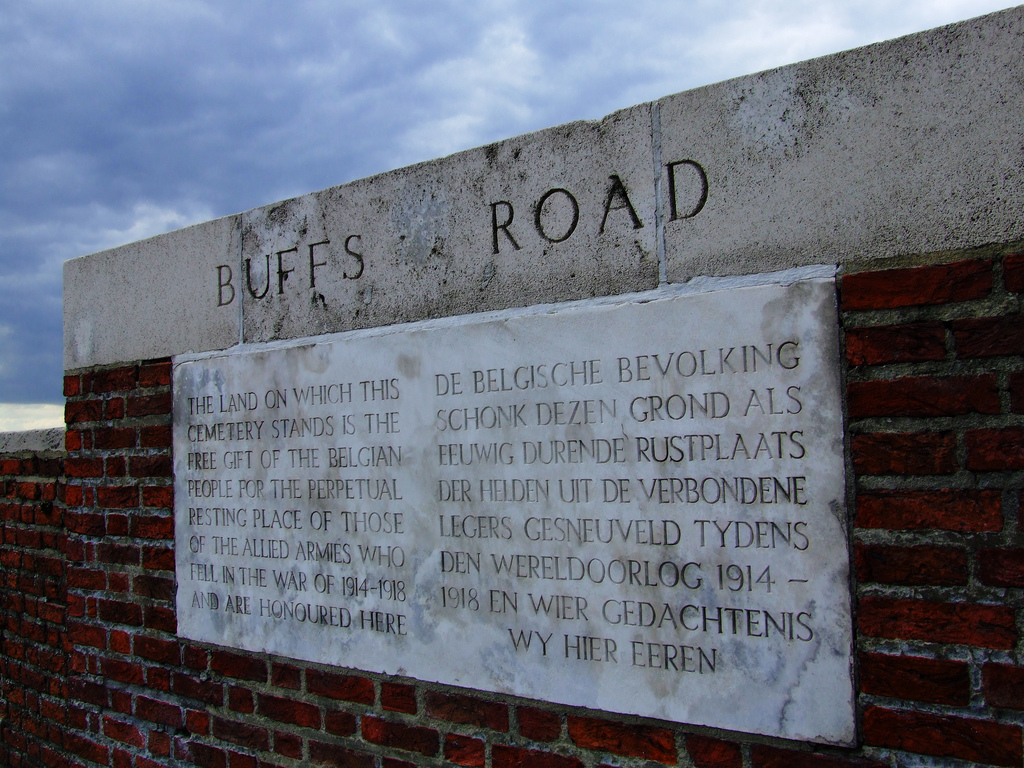
- Used for those deceased 1917–1918
- Established: July 1917
- Location: 50°52′36″N 02°54′58″E near Ypres, West Flanders, Belgium
- Designed by: A J S Hutton
- Total burials: 289

Burials by nation
- Allies of World War I: United Kingdom: 265; Australia: 13; Canada: 10; South Africa: 1

Burials by war
- World War I: 289

UNESCO World Heritage Site
- Official name: Funerary and memory sites of the First World War (Western Front)
- Type: Cultural
- Criteria: i, ii, vi
- Designated: 2023 (45th session)
- Reference no.: 1567-FL15

Buffs Road Cemetery is a Commonwealth War Graves Commission (CWGC) burial ground for the dead of the First World War located near Ypres (Dutch: Ieper) in Belgium on the Western Front.

The cemetery grounds were assigned to the United Kingdom in perpetuity by King Albert I of Belgium in recognition of the sacrifices made by the British Empire in the defence and liberation of Belgium during the war.

== Foundation ==
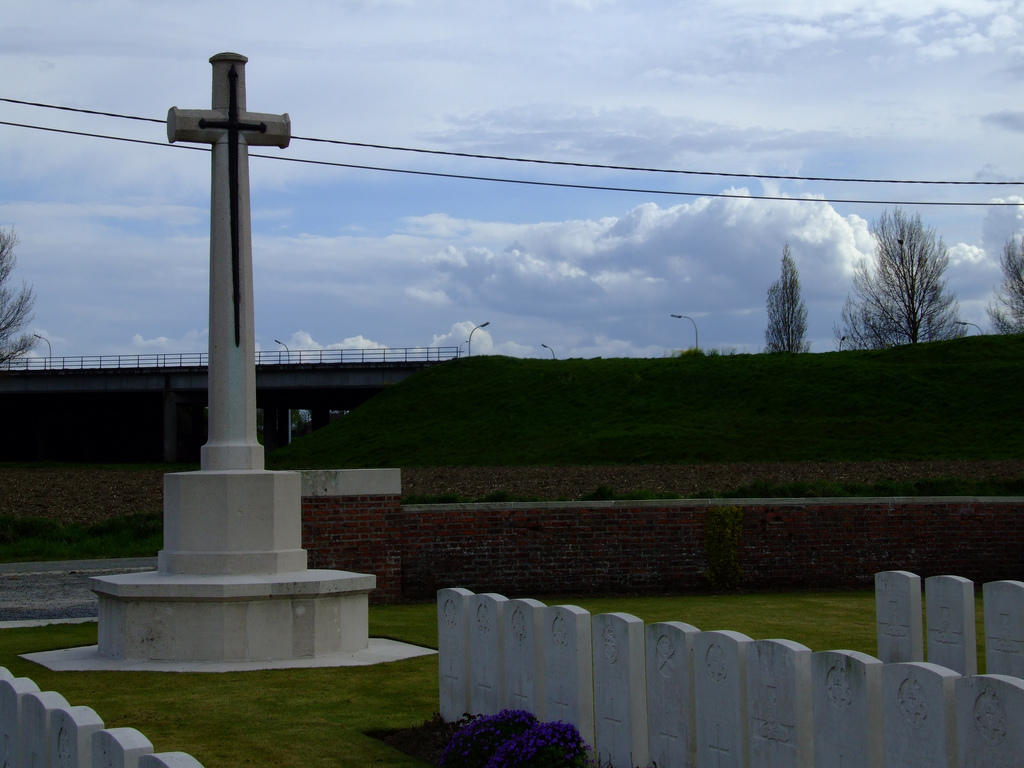
The Cross of Sacrifice or "War Cross"

The cemetery, named after the nickname of a nearby small lane, was founded in July 1917 by the 12th, 13th and 14th Royal Sussex Regiment and the Royal Artillery. After the armistice, the cemetery was enlarged by concentrating battlefield graves and that of one officer buried in Brielen Churchyard in 1915, whilst one Belgian soldier was removed.

The cemetery was designed by A J S Hutton.
