= Rifle House Cemetery =

WWI CWGC burial ground in Ypres, Belgium

Rifle House, Ploegsteert
- Commonwealth War Graves Commission
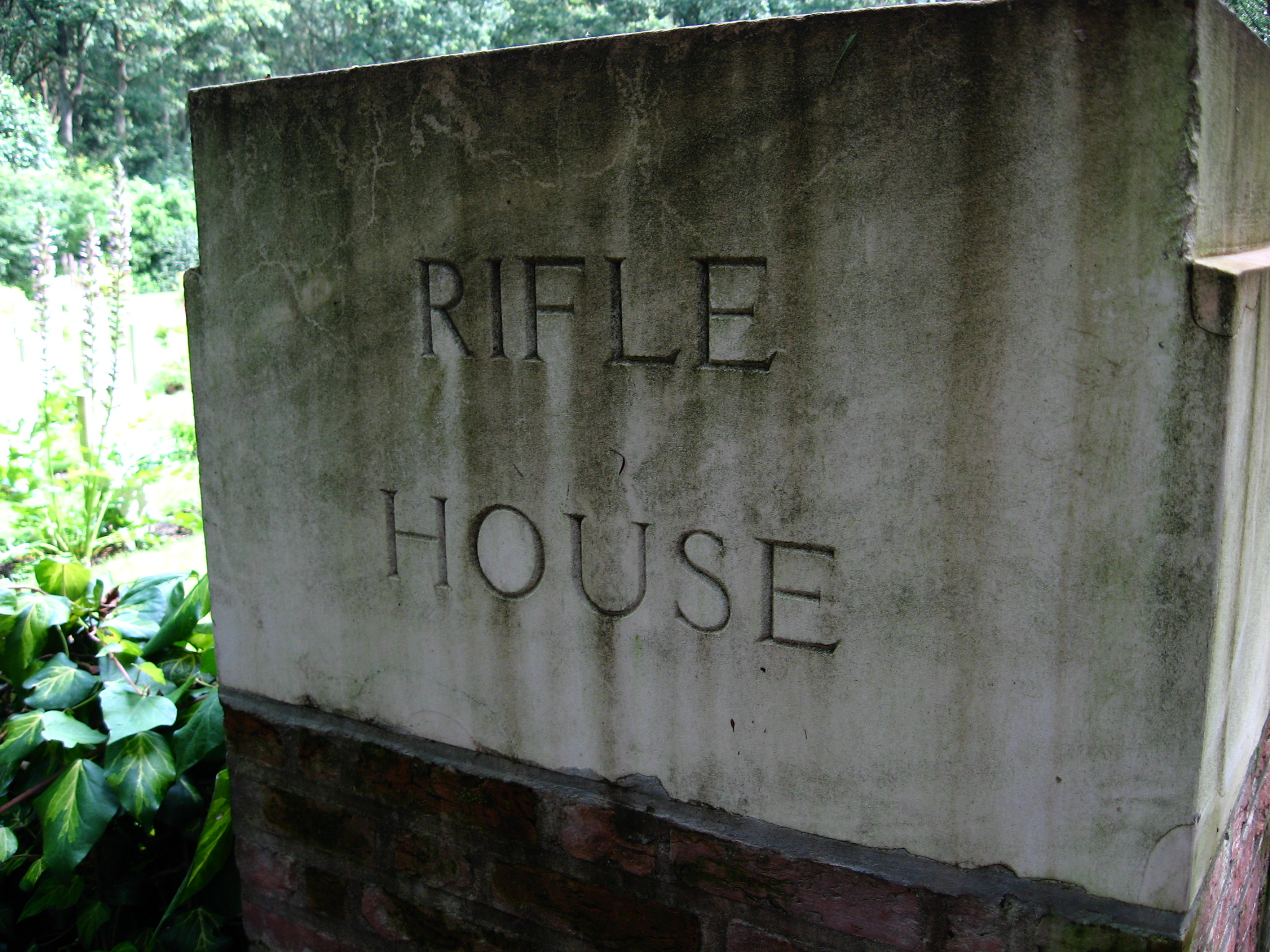
- Used for those deceased 1914-1916
- Established: November 1914
- Location: 50°44′09″N 02°54′04″E near Comines-Warneton, Hainaut, Belgium
- Designed by: W H Cowlishaw
- Total burials: 230
- Unknowns: 2

Burials by nation
- Allied Powers: United Kingdom: 229; Canada: 1

Burials by war
- World War I: 230

UNESCO World Heritage Site
- Official name: Funerary and memory sites of the First World War (Western Front)
- Type: Cultural
- Criteria: i, ii, vi
- Designated: 2023 (45th session)
- Reference no.: 1567-WA16

Rifle House Cemetery is a Commonwealth War Graves Commission burial ground for the dead of the First World War located near Ypres on the Western Front. The cemetery grounds were assigned to the United Kingdom in perpetuity by King Albert I of Belgium in recognition of the sacrifices made by the British Empire in the defence and liberation of Belgium during the war.

== Foundation ==
The cemetery takes its name from a strong point that stood in Ploegsteert Wood of which no trace now remains. Founded in November 1914, it was in use until June 1916.

The cemetery fell into German hands on 10 April 1918 during the Spring Offensive, but fell back to the Allies on 29 September 1918 as the Hundred Days Offensive swept north and east.

The cemetery was designed by W H Cowlishaw.

== Notable graves ==
This cemetery contains the last resting place of Rifleman Robert Barnett of the 1st Battalion Rifle Brigade, who died on 19 December 1914. He was 15 years old.
