= William Harrison Cowlishaw =

W. H. Cowlishaw
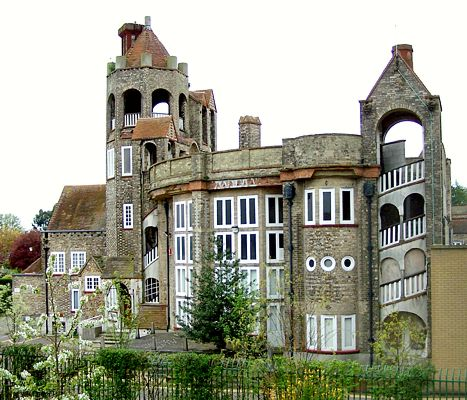
- The Cloisters in Letchworth
- Born: 1869
- Died: 1957 (aged 87–88)
- Occupation: Architect
- Buildings: The Cloisters (Letchworth)
- Projects: Commonwealth War Graves Commission sites around Ypres

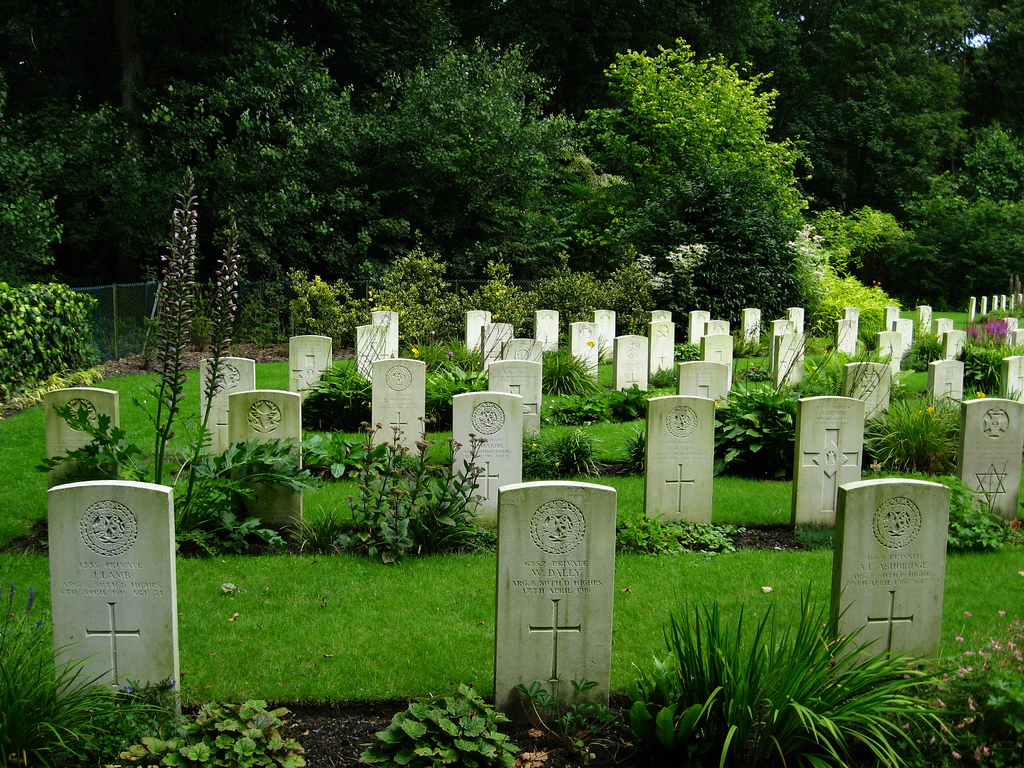
Rifle House cemetery in Belgium

William Harrison Cowlishaw (1869–1957) was a British architect of the European Arts and Crafts school and a follower of William Morris.

He lived in Norton, Hertfordshire, at that time something of an artists' colony. One of his most famous works is the unusual towered The Cloisters in neighbouring Letchworth Garden City, planned as a theosophical meditation centre and open-air school and which opened in 1907.

An earlier work was "The Cearne" in Crockham Hill, Kent, a house designed for Russian-translator Constance Garnett and her literary-editor husband Edward Garnett. It was built in 1896. Cowlishaw married Edward Garnett's youngest sister, Lucy, in April 1897.

At the end of World War I, like many Arts and Crafts architects of the period, he was commissioned by the Imperial (now Commonwealth) War Graves Commission to design memorials and cemetery layouts in Flanders and France under Sir Frederic G. Kenyon, the commission's advisor on architecture and layout.

His work included the Pozières Memorial, in the Somme department (completed in 1930), to commemorate the missing of the Fifth and Fourth Armies, killed in 1918. Among the smaller cemeteries he designed were Prowse Point, Rifle House and Devonshire, all around the area of Ypres.

At the commission, he worked with Charles Holden, a relationship that continued after the memorial work was completed.
