= Capture of Ovillers =

British operation during the Battle of Albert

- Part of the Battle of the Somme, of the First World War
- Battle of the Somme 1 July – 18 November 1916
| Date | 1–16 July 1916 |
| Location | Picardy, France 50°01′56″N 02°41′55″E |
| Result | British victory |

Belligerents
| Britain | Germany |

Commanders and leaders
| (United Kingdom of Great Britain and Ireland) Douglas Haig | (German Empire) Erich von Falkenhayn |

Strength
| 1 division | two regiments |

Casualties and losses
| 1 July: 5,121 | 1 July: 315 |
- Ovillers, a commune in the Somme department of Picardy, northern France

The Capture of Ovillers (1–16 July 1916) was a British local operation during the Battle of Albert in France, the name given by the British to the first two weeks of the Battle of the Somme. The village of Ovillers-la-Boisselle (commonly shortened to Ovillers) forms part of the small commune of Ovillers-la-Boisselle, about 22 mi (35 km) north-east of Amiens in the Somme department in Picardie in northern France. By 1916, the village was called Ovillers by the British Expeditionary Force (BEF) to avoid confusion with La Boisselle south-west of the road.

On 1 July 1916, the first day on the Somme, Ovillers was attacked by the 8th Division, part of the III Corps. The attack was a disaster and the division suffered 5,121 casualties, the defending Infantry Regiment 180 had 280 casualties and Reserve Infantry Regiment 110 35 casualties. The 8th Division was withdrawn and replaced by the 12th (Eastern) Division, which resumed the attack on Ovillers on 3 July and suffered 4,721 casualties by the time it was relieved. Attacks by the 25th Division continued and the village was captured during the evening of 16 July.

== Background ==
=== 1914 ===
In 1914, Ovillers was a village to the north of the D 929 Albert–Bapaume road, north-east of Aveluy and south-west of Pozières. To the south-east, across the D 929 at the junction of the D 104 to Contalmaison, lay La Boisselle. The XIV Reserve Corps (Generalleutnant [Lieutenant-General] Richard von Schubert then Generalleutnant Hermann von Stein from 14 September) began operations west of Bapaume in late September by advancing down the Bapaume–Albert road to the Ancre river, preparatory to an advance down the Somme valley to Amiens. By 29 September, the attack had been stopped by the French around Fricourt and La Boisselle, south of Ovillers. In early November, French artillery reinforcements arrived and bombardments beyond the front line began. On 19 November, two divisions of XI Corps attacked to fix German troops but were repulsed and on 28 November, an attack by the XIV Corps managed to advance the French line by 980–1,310 ft (300–400 m). In early December, IV Corps attacked and gained 980–3,280 ft (300–1,000 m). The French attacks had been costly and gained little ground.

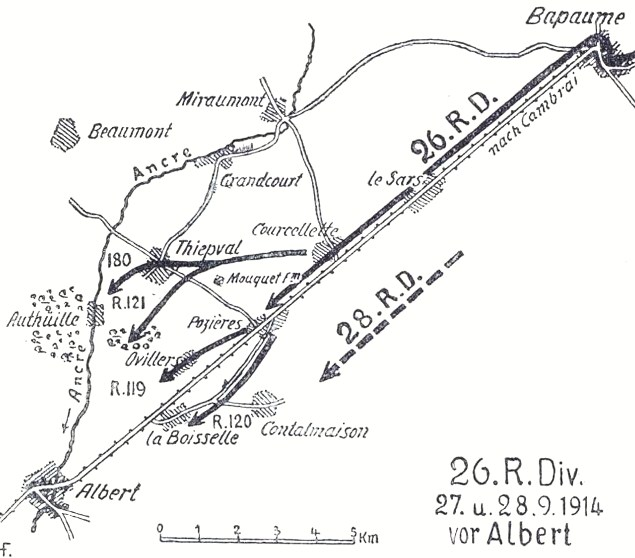
Diagram of the 26th (Württemberg) Reserve Division and the 28th (Baden) Reserve Division attacks towards Albert, late September 1914

Attacks by the French 53rd Reserve Division of XI Corps, took place from 17 December, the 118th Battalion reached the cemetery of La Boisselle and the 19th Infantry Regiment closed on the western fringe of Ovillers. A German counter-bombardment then swept the ground west of Ovillers and Ravine 92, which prevented the approach of French reserves. During the night the French survivors fell back to the French front line, except at La Boisselle. Next day the XI Corps broke through the German defences at La Boisselle cemetery but was stopped a short distance forward, in front of trenches protected by barbed wire. On 24 December, the 118th Infantry Regiment and two battalions of the 64th Infantry Regiment attacked again at La Boisselle at 9:00 a.m. after a bombardment. The 118th Regiment captured a small number of houses in the south-east of the village and consolidated the area during the night. The 64th Regiment overran the German first line but was held up short of a second trench, which had not been discovered before the attack and then dug in, having lost many casualties.

=== 1915 ===
In January 1915, General Erich von Falkenhayn, head of Oberste Heeresleitung (OHL, German General Staff) ordered the creation of a systematic defensive system on the Western Front, capable of withstanding attacks indefinitely, with a relatively small garrison. Barbed wire obstacles were enlarged from one belt 5–10 yd (4.6–9.1 m) wide to two, 30 yd (27 m) wide and about 15 yd (14 m) apart. Double and triple thickness wire was used and laid 3–5 ft (0.91–1.52 m) high. The front line was increased from one trench to three, dug 150–200 yd (140–180 m) apart, the first trench (Kampfgraben) to be occupied by sentry groups, the second (Wohngraben) for the front-trench garrison and the third trench for local reserves. The trenches were traversed and had sentry-posts in concrete recesses built into the parapet. Dugouts had been deepened from 6–9 ft (1.8–2.7 m) to 20–30 ft (6.1–9.1 m), 50 yd (46 m) apart and made large enough for 25 men. An intermediate line of strong points (Stützpunktlinie) about 1,000 yd (910 m) behind the front line was also built. Communication trenches ran back to the reserve line, renamed the second line, which was as well built and wired as the first line. The second line was beyond the range of Allied field artillery, to force an attacker to stop and move artillery forward before assaulting the line.

In mid-July 1915, extensive troop and artillery moves north of the Ancre were seen by German observers. The type of shell fired by the new artillery changed from high explosive to shrapnel and unexploded shells were found to be of a different design. The new infantry opposite did not continue the live-and-let-live practices of their forerunners and a larger number of machine-guns began firing against the German lines, which did not pause every 25 shots, like French Hotchkiss machine guns. German troops were reluctant to believe that the British had assembled an army large enough to extend as far south as the Somme and a soldier seen near Thiepval, was thought to be a French soldier in a grey hat. By 4 August, it was officially reported by OHL that the 52nd Division and the 26th Reserve Division had seen a man in a brown suit. On 9 August, the situation became clear when a British soldier working in no man's land got lost in a mist and was captured.

=== 1916 ===
Bassin de la Somme

After the Second Battle of Champagne (Autumn Battle 25 September – 6 November 1915), a third defence line another 3,000 yd (1.7 mi; 2.7 km) back from the Stützpunktlinie was begun in February and was nearly complete on the Somme front when the battle began. German artillery was organised in a series of Sperrfeuerstreifen (barrage sectors); each officer was expected to know the batteries covering his section of the front line and the batteries to be ready to engage fleeting targets. A telephone system was built, with lines buried 6 ft (1.8 m) deep for 5 mi (8.0 km) behind the front line, to connect the front line to the artillery. The Somme defences had two inherent weaknesses which the rebuilding had not remedied. The front trenches were on a forward slope, lined by white chalk from the subsoil and easily seen by ground observers. The defences were crowded towards the front trench, with a regiment having two battalions near the front-trench system and the reserve battalion divided between the Stützpunktlinie and the second line, all within 2,000 yd (1,800 m) and most troops within 1,000 yd (910 m) of the front line, accommodated in the new deep dugouts.

The concentration of troops in the front line on a forward slope guaranteed that it would face the bulk of an artillery bombardment, directed by ground observers, on clearly marked lines. Digging and wiring of a new third line began in May, civilians were moved away and stocks of ammunition and hand-grenades were increased in the front-line. By mid-June Below and Rupprecht expected an attack on the 2nd Army which held the front from Noyon to beyond Gommecourt, although Falkenhayn was more concerned about an offensive in Alsace-Lorraine and then a possible attack on the 6th Army, which held the front from near Gommecourt to St. Eloi close to Ypres. In April, Falkenhayn had suggested a spoiling attack by the 6th Army but lack of troops and artillery engaged in the offensive at Verdun, made it impractical. Some labour battalions and captured Russian heavy artillery were sent to the 2nd Army, Below proposed a preventive attack in May and a reduced operation from Ovillers to St. Pierre Divion in June but got only one extra artillery regiment. On 6 June, Below reported that air reconnaissance indicated an offensive at Fricourt and Gommecourt.

The south side of the Somme had been reinforced by the French, against whom the XVII Corps was overstretched, with twelve regiments to hold 22 mi (36 km) and no reserves. In mid-June, Falkenhayn was sceptical of an offensive on the Somme, since a great success would lead to operations in Belgium, when an offensive in Alsace-Lorraine would take the war and its devastation into Germany. More railway activity, fresh digging and camp extensions around Albert opposite the 2nd Army, was seen by German air observers on 9 and 11 June and spies reported an imminent offensive. On 24 June, a British prisoner spoke of a five-day bombardment, to begin on 26 June and local units expected an attack within days. On 27 June, 14 balloons were visible, one for each British division but no German reinforcements were sent to the area until 1 July and only then to the 6th Army, which was given control of the three divisions in reserve behind it. At Verdun on 24 June, Crown Prince Wilhelm was ordered to conserve troops, ammunition and equipment and further restrictions were imposed on 1 July, when two divisions were put under OHL control.

== Prelude ==
=== British offensive preparations ===
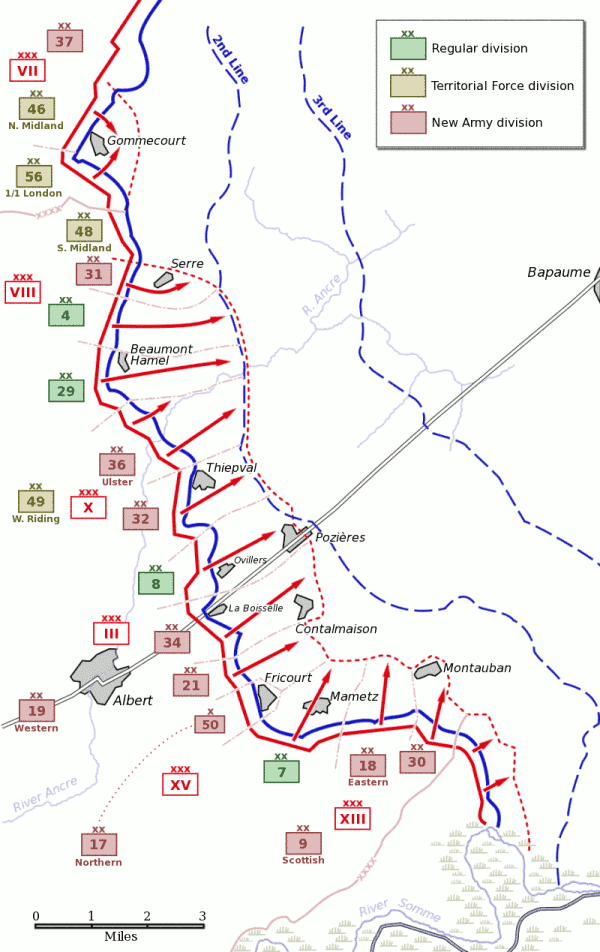
Anglo-French objectives, north bank of the Somme, 1 July 1916

The British front line from Bécourt to Authuille was held by III Corps (Lieutenant-General William Pulteney) and lay along the forward slope of a low ridge between La Boisselle and Albert, east of Tara and Usna hills, which was a continuation of the south-west spur from the main Bazentin Ridge on which lay Ovillers. In dead ground behind the ridge, field artillery was deployed in rows and artillery observers watched from positions on the ridge, with a perfect view of the German front position, which ran along the higher slopes of three spurs, which descend south-west from the main ridge, where each trench had a distinct white chalk parapet. No man's land was up to 800 yd (730 m) wide, with the left flank of the corps west of Ovillers Spur. Depressions between the spurs called Mash and Nab valleys were about 1,000 yd (910 m) wide at their broadest points, which made an advance up them vulnerable to crossfire, from trench networks and machine-gun posts on either side. Thiepval Spur to the north, opposite X Corps, overlooked the ground across which the III Corps divisions must advance.

The III Corps artillery had 98 heavy guns and howitzers, and the loan of a groupe of the French 18th Field Artillery Regiment, to fire gas shells. The corps artillery was divided into two field artillery groups for each attacking division and a fifth group, containing the heaviest artillery, to cover the corps front. The artillery was supported by most of 3 Squadron Royal Flying Corps (RFC) for artillery observation and reconnaissance sorties. There was one heavy gun for each 40 yd (37 m) of front and a field gun for every 23 yd (21 m). The heavy group had one 15-inch howitzer, three 12-inch howitzers on railway mountings, twelve 9.2-inch howitzers, sixteen 8-inch howitzers and twenty 6-inch howitzers, one 12-inch gun, one 9.2-inch gun (both on railway mountings), four 6-inch guns, thirty-two 60-pounder guns and eight 4.7-inch guns. During the preliminary bombardment, the III Corps artillery was hampered by poor-quality field gun ammunition, which caused premature shell-explosions in gun barrels and casualties to the gunners. Many howitzer shells fell short and there was a large number of blinds (duds) but long-range fire was more successful and a 12-inch railway gun chased Generalleutnant Hermann von Stein, the XIV Reserve Corps commander and his staff out of Bapaume on 1 July.

=== British plan of attack ===
Somme weather (23 June – 1 July 1916)
| Date | Rain mm | Temp (°F) | |
|---|---|---|---|
| 23 | 2.0 | 79°–55° | wind |
| 24 | 1.0 | 72°–52° | dull |
| 25 | 1.0 | 71°–54° | wind |
| 26 | 6.0 | 72°–52° | cloud |
| 27 | 8.0 | 68°–54° | cloud |
| 28 | 2.0 | 68°–50° | dull |
| 29 | 0.1 | 66°–52° | cloud wind |
| 30 | 0.0 | 72°–48° | dull high wind |

In the III Corps area, heavy artillery fire was to jump from one German defence line to the next in eight lifts. The infantry advance was to be preceded by field artillery barrages which moved back slowly on a timetable. The sixth lift was to fall on a line behind Contalmaison and Pozières, 85 minutes after zero hour and the eighth lift was to fall 1,000 yd (910 m) beyond after another 22 minutes, a procession into the German defences of 2 mi (3.2 km) in 107 minutes. The field artillery barrage was to move "very slowly", raking back to the next German trench line in lifts of 50–100–150 yd (46–91–137 m) but was to move faster than the speed of the infantry advance, so was not a true creeping barrage. On 28 June, the Fourth Army headquarters ordered that if the initial attacks caused the German defence to collapse, the closest infantry would exploit without waiting for cavalry of the Reserve Army (Lieutenant-General Hubert Gough), which was assembled 5 mi (8.0 km) west of Albert and was to advance once the roads had been cleared.

Gough had the 1st Cavalry Division, 2nd Indian Cavalry Division and 3rd Cavalry Division and the 12th (Eastern) Division and 25th Division, ready to advance through any gap formed and turn north, to roll up the German defences. On the right flank of III Corps, the 34th Division, composed of Pals battalions, was to capture the German positions on the Fricourt Spur and Sausage valley to the far side of La Boisselle and then advance to a line about 800 yd (730 m) short of the German second line, from Contalmaison to Pozières. The division would have to capture a fortified village and six German trench lines, in a 2 mi (3.2 km) advance on a 2,000 yd (1,800 m) front. The 19th (Western) Division (19th Division) in corps reserve was to move forward to vacated trenches in the Tara–Usna line, ready to relieve the attacking divisions after the objectives had been reached. If the German defences collapsed the 19th Division and 49th (West Riding) Division in reserve, were to advance either side of the Albert–Bapaume road under the command of the Reserve Army.

No man's land was unusually wide on the 8th Division front, particularly on the right flank where both front lines bent back. The 8th Division plan was to attack with all three brigades against the Ovillers Spur, which dominates the ground north of the Albert–Bapaume road. The centre brigade would benefit from a covered approach until the last 300–400 yd (270–370 m) up to the village but the flanking brigades would have to advance up the re-entrants of Mash Valley to the south and Nab Valley to the north, exposed on flat ground without cover to the German garrisons in La Boisselle and the Leipzig salient. Hudson asked for the divisional zero hour to be postponed slightly so that the 34th Division to the south and the 32nd Division to the north would have engaged these positions before the infantry advanced. Rawlinson rejected the request but put a battery of the 32nd Division artillery at the disposal of the 8th Division (Major-General Havelock Hudson) to suppress enfilade fire. The 23rd Brigade (Brigadier-General H. D. Tuson attack would be up Mash Valley, with the right flank to gain the Albert–Bapaume road south of Ovillers. The brigade was then to advance 1 mi (1.6 km) up the road to Pozières. The 25th Brigade (Brigadier-General J. H. W. Pollard) was to capture Ovillers and the 70th Brigade (Brigadier-General H. Gordon) was to attack the south slope of Nab Valley to the north of Ovillers and then forward to the German second position north of Pozières, left to Mouquet Farm.

=== German defensive preparations ===
Behind the front line at Ovillers were intermediate lines from Fricourt to Ovillers and from Contalmaison to Pozières (unfinished) and further back was the second position from Bazentin le Petit to Mouquet Farm. There was a third position 3 mi (4.8 km) behind the second position but all of the trench defences were on a forward slope, easy to see and bombard but the spurs and re-entrants were excellent defensive features. Infantry Regiment 180 (IR 180) of the 26th Reserve Division took over the Ovillers sector from Reserve Infantry Regiment 109 (RIR 109) in early June, from the Leipzig Salient (Granatloch, shell farm) to the southern approaches to Ovillers, in sectors P1 to P7 leftwards from the Granatloch. RIR 99 held the defences beyond the right flank and RIR 110 continued the line southwards across the Bapaume–Albert road. When IR 180 arrived in the area, the defences were found to be tolerable but with some improvements needed and work began immediately. The position had deep fields of barbed wire covered by machine-gun posts and many communication trenches, which made quick movement within the position possible and could be used to contain a penetration of the front line. The seven-day bombardment before 1 July cut much of the wire but the field works beyond were far less affected,

The heavy torpedo mines caused great devastation to the trenches, however the dugouts held up excellently against them, the losses through the bombardment remained miraculously low, the mood of the men was splendid.

— Whitehead

the dug-out entrances were vulnerable to the bombardment and were under constant repair and as parts of trenches were demolished, shell-craters remained for cover. At 4:45 a.m. on 1 July, the 2nd Army headquarters sent forward a message that the British attack was imminent and at 7:00 a.m., two machine-gun crews began traversing fire low over the British front line trench.

== Battle ==
=== 1 July ===
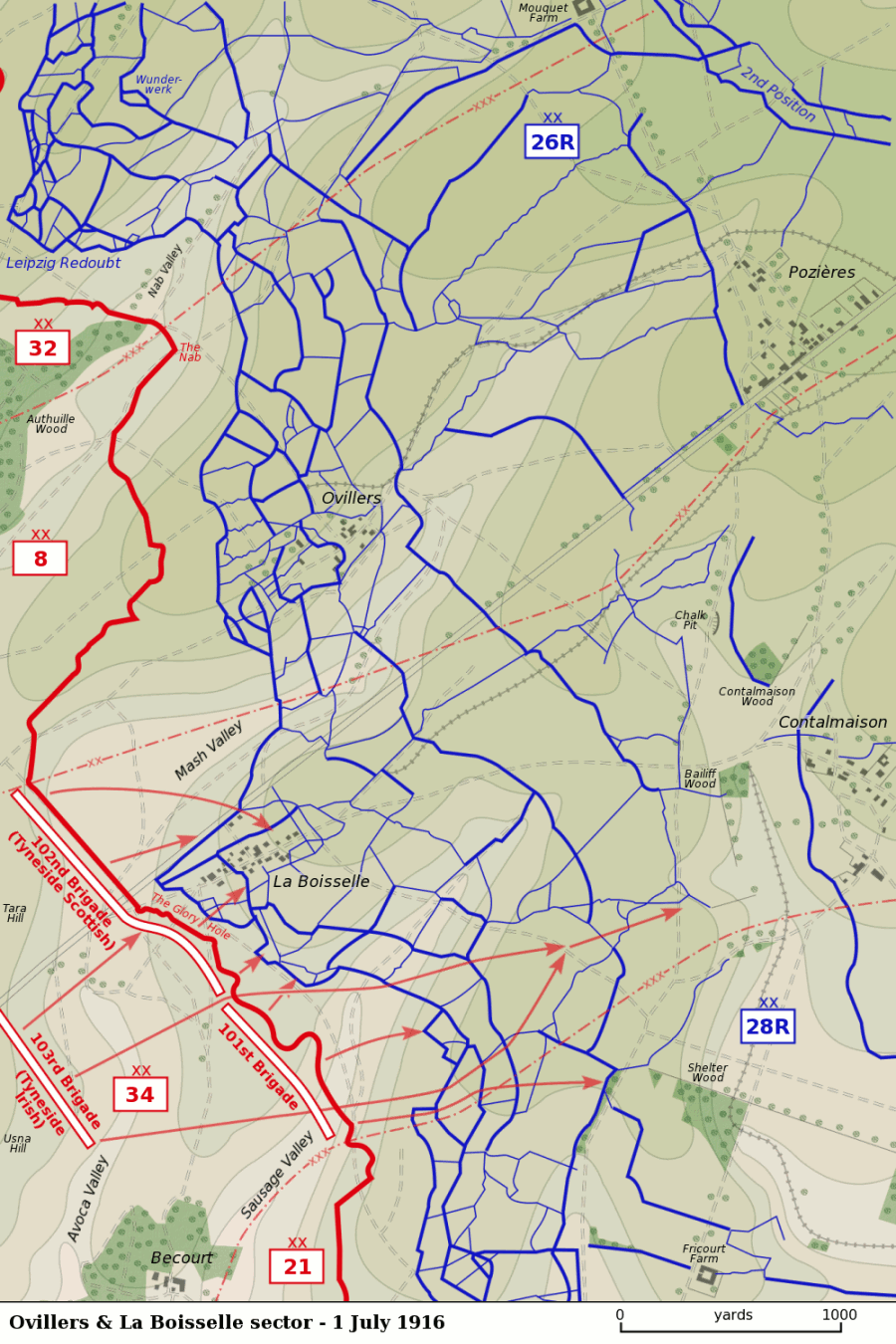
Ovillers sector (in upper half), 1 July 1916

Eight minutes before zero, 24 Stokes mortars in hidden emplacements on the 25th and 70th brigade fronts, fired 80–100 bombs each on the German front line, as the leading infantry crept forward about 200–300 yd (180–270 m) into no man's land. Two German machine-guns had opened fire at 7:00 a.m. and swept the British front line trench and immediately the British infantry left the trench, small-arms fire began from the German lines. At 7:30 a.m., the British guns lifted to the second objective, the mortars ceased fire and the infantry rose, each battalion in four lines of companies, fifty paces apart on 400 yd (370 m) fronts. German machine-gun fire increased from La Boisselle, Ovillers and the second trench as the troops moved forward over ground devoid of cover. When the first wave was 80 yd (73 m) short of the German front line, German small-arms fire increased in intensity and artillery began to barrage no man's land and the British front trenches. The 8th Division troops who had not been hit began to run, the ground being un-cratered and bunched up, casualties increased rapidly, the increased speed of movement making no difference.

A few parties reached the German front trench and on the 23rd Brigade front, troops of the two leading battalions overran the trench and some got to the second trench 200 yd (180 m) further on, before crossfire from the flanks stopped the advance. About 70 survivors re-organised in a 300 yd (270 m) length of the front trench and held out for two hours, before running out of grenades and being attacked from both flanks. The party retreated over no man's land past the supporting waves pinned down in the open, wounded and dying. German trench sentries had given the alarm and the 10th and 11th companies of IR 180 in their deep underground shelters, rushed up and took post or occupied shell-holes. Where telephone lines had been cut, IR 180 used rockets and flags to signal to the artillery, which commenced barrage fire on no man's land and the British lines. Sectors P7 to P5 were approached by the 23rd Brigade, whose attack broke down and when a few men came close to the German front line, the defenders fired at maximum intensity. Small parties got beyond the front line between Bumiller Graben (Bumiller Trench) and Siegel Graben and kept going. The approach routes to the German front line had been blocked and were guarded by bombing parties, which began counter-attacks from the flanks; a tactic that IR 180 had trained other units in before the offensive. The 10th Company was able to detach a platoon to reinforce RIR 110 to the south and the 10th and 11th companies had 68 and 80 casualties respectively. (Note: The III Battalion, RIR 110 assisted IR 180 by moving from reserve to the Mittelweg, recovering a machine-gun and firing into La Boisselle Mulde (La Boisselle Hollow: Mash Valley), as the support battalion tried to cross no man's land.)

Somme weather (1–14 July 1916)
| Date | Rain mm | Temp (°F) | |
|---|---|---|---|
| 1 | 0.0 | 75°–54° | clear hazy |
| 2 | 0.0 | 75°–54° | clear fine |
| 3 | 2.0 | 68°–55° | fine |
| 4 | 17.0 | 70°–55° | storm |
| 5 | 0.0 | 72–52° | low cloud |
| 6 | 2.0 | 70°–54° | rain |
| 7 | 13.0 | 70°–59° | rain |
| 8 | 8.0 | 73°–52° | rain |
| 9 | 0.0 | 70°–53° | cloud |
| 10 | 0.0 | 82°–48° | dull |
| 11 | 0.0 | 68°–52° | dull |
| 12 | 0.1 | 68°– / | dull |
| 13 | 0.1 | 70°–54° | dull |
| 14 | 0.0 | 70°– / | dull |
| 15 | 0.0 | 72°–47° | sun |
| 16 | 4.0 | 73°–55° | dull |
| 17 | 0.0 | 70°–59° | mist |

On the 25th Brigade front, the infantry suffered a similar fate but small parties were able to rush from shell-hole to shell-hole and get into the front trench at 7:50 a.m., only to find it so badly damaged that there was no cover and consolidation failed. A few troops reached the second trench but by 9:00 a.m. had been forced out by enfilade fire and counter-attacks by bombers. The support battalion had moved up to the British front line, been caught by the German barrage and then had many casualties trying to cross no man's land, the three battalions all losing more than fifty percent of their men; only after night fell were the survivors able to return. Parts of the 10th, 9th companies IR 180 faced the attack, with the 12th and 6th companies in support. Only on the left side of Sector P5, which had been the most damaged part of the defences was penetrated but much of the garrison was caught underground trying to dig their way through collapsed entrances. When the British tried to broaden the penetration the 9th and 10th companies blocked the trenches and engaged the British from Kuhm and Baum saps on the flanks and the second trench in front, forcing the British slowly back to the front trench, where about 902 ft (275 m) was occupied.

Parts of the 6th and 10th companies counter-attacked from the third trench between Baum and Leichen saps while bombing attacks were made from the flanks, assisted by the 2nd Company, which moved through the front trench beyond Kronen and Kuhm saps. The British party held out for about ninety minutes then ran out of grenades and ammunition and retreated from shell-hole to shell-hole, under small-arms and artillery fire. About a battalion worth of infantry had repulsed a brigade and captured machine-guns in the 9th Company sector. Once the British had retreated, the Germans concentrated on the British front line and the flanks of later attempts by the British to cross no man's land. Machine-guns fired just over the British trench parapets and heavy artillery dropped shells into the British front and support lines, causing many casualties among the troops which did not attack and devastating those which did. When the 1st Royal Irish Rifles tried to follow up the initial attacking battalions, only about ten men got across no man's land.

The 70th Brigade attack was helped by the 32nd Division attack on the Leipzig Salient which received much of the machine-gun fire from the salient and posts on Thiepval Spur, the two leading waves crossing the 400 yd (370 m) of no man's land and reaching the second trench, except for the works north-east of the Nab. The next two waves were pinned down and the advance towards the third trench 200 yd (180 m) on, slowed and only a few parties reached it. Reinforcements did not appear and the support battalion was engaged by machine-guns on the Thiepval Spur at 600–800 yd (550–730 m). The support battalion lost half of its men almost immediately and hardly any got across no man's land. The reserve battalion was moving forward and because it appeared that the attacks by the divisions on the flanks had succeeded, Gordon ordered it to attack. The troops had to pick their way through wounded and dead in the British trenches and the first wave was shot down in no man's land and on the German wire by German infantry, who appeared in the front trench and the second wave was shot down by machine-gun fire. A party of fifty bombers tried to advance along a sunken road from the Nab towards Mouquet Farm but a machine-gun fired down the road and stopped them 80 yd (73 m) short of the front trench. As time passed, the volume of German small-arms fire sweeping Ovillers Spur cut off communication with the troops in the German defences, even by visual signalling.

The 1st, 2nd and part of the 9th Company IR 180 and the 5th Company in support held the Nab, where the British bombardment had demolished the front trench andFölkersamb sap in Sector P4. The British captured the first trench from Klinkowstrom and Kronen saps and pushed on but could not widen the breach, which enabled the Germans to concentrate their firepower against the break-in and help RIR 99 on the right. The defenders against the 70th Brigade benefitted from fire by a Belgian machine-gun and one in the Lembergstellung to the north. Some of the British got as far as Battle Headquarters North but were in such a narrow salient that the 1st, 2nd and 5th companies were able to repeat the tactics used further south. The penetration was contained and machine-gunners in the Leipzig Redoubt (Granatloch), on Thiepval Spur and the Nordwerk to the south fired into the area. British attempts to reinforce the men in Sector P4 were defeated and as the 32nd Division attack to the north was repulsed, more guns of RIR 99 began to engage the 70th Brigade, the support battalion losing 50 percent casualties as soon as it tried to cross from the British front line. The sunken road used by the party of bombers attempting to get forward was Naumann sap to the Germans and only 15 men of the party survived the attempt.

When the British reserve battalion attacked, few in the first wave reached the German wire and the troops in the salient up to the third trench were cut off. The Germans began systematically to overrun the area and the survivors eventually retreated to shell-holes near the German front trench. British observers saw troops on the German parapet bombing the Germans at 2:30 p.m. but the area was captured soon afterwards. Firing died down and after the 8th Division ceased attempts to reinforce the parties in the German front line, the Germans watched British stretcher-bearers collect wounded but there were still many men lying in no man's land as dark fell and many could be heard crying out in the night. Soldiers of IR 180 recovered British wounded close to the German lines but when British troops rose up and tried to get away they were fired on. The dead were buried where they fell, the wounded were moved back to dressing stations and non-wounded prisoners were taken further back for interrogation and despatched to prison camps. IR 180 had 280 casualties and RIR 110 35 casualties against the 8th Division.

=== 2–3 July ===
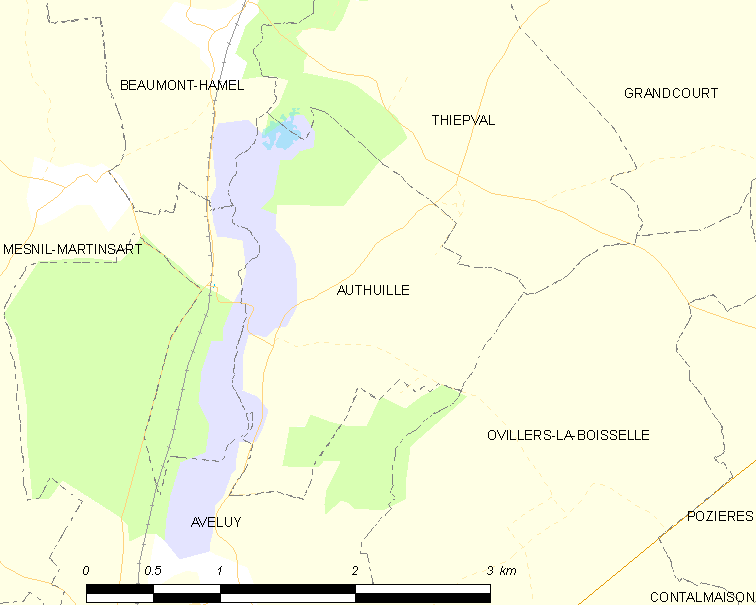
Modern map of Ovillers and vicinity (commune FR insee code 80615)

Details of the costly defeat of most British attacks north of the Albert–Bapaume road had not reached GHQ on the evening of 1 July and Haig ordered that the attack resume as soon as possible. At 10:00 p.m., Rawlinson ordered the corps of the Fourth Army to attack as soon as possible, as long as artillery preparation had taken place. Pulteney was ordered to capture La Boisselle and Ovillers, then Contalmaison, establishing a defensive flank between the two villages. Gough was sent forward by Rawlinson to take command of the divisions north of III Corps and the 12th (Eastern) Division was sent from reserve to relieve the 8th Division. The divisional relief took so long that the 12th (Eastern) Division was unable to resume the attack at dawn on 2 July. A night attack on La Boisselle was arranged for 2/3 July and Ovillers was bombarded from 3:30 to 4:00 p.m. as a diversion, which attracted German artillery-fire during the attack. The 12th (Eastern) Division effort was put back to 3:15 a.m. on 3 July, after a one-hour preparatory bombardment. (The day dawned dull with high cloud and there was a thunderstorm in the afternoon.)

A preparatory bombardment began at 2:12 a.m. on 3 July, against the same targets as 1 July but with the addition of the artillery of the 19th Division to the south. Assembly trenches had been dug, which reduced the width of no man's land from 800–500 yd (730–460 m) at its widest. Two brigades of the 12th (Eastern) Division attacked at 3:15 a.m., with the left flank covered by a smokescreen. Red rockets were fired immediately by the Germans and answered by field and heavy artillery barrages on the British assembly, front line and communication trenches, most of which were empty, as the British infantry had moved swiftly across no man's land. The four attacking battalions found enough gaps in the German wire to enter the front trench and press on to the support (third) trench but German infantry emerged from dugouts in the first line, to counter-attack them from behind. At dawn, little could be seen in the dust and smoke, especially on the left, where the smokescreen blew back. Most of the battalions which reached the German line were overwhelmed when their hand grenades and ammunition ran out, carriers not being able to cross no man's land through the German barrage and machine-gun fire. The attack was reported to be a complete failure by 9:00 a.m. and the last foothold on the edge of Ovillers was lost later on. A company lost direction in the dark, stumbled into La Boisselle and took 220 German prisoners but the 12th division lost 2,400 casualties.

=== 7–9 July ===
After a boundary change, an attack by X Corps, which took over from the III Corps at Ovillers, was delayed by a German attack after a bombardment fell on the 49th Division front near the Ancre. The British position in the German first line north of Thiepval was attacked and the survivors of the garrison were forced to retreat to the British front line by 6:00 a.m. The 12th (Eastern) Division Brigades and a 25th Division brigade advanced on Ovillers, two battalions of the 74th Brigade on the south side of the Albert–Bapaume road reaching the first German trench, where the number of casualties and continuous German machine-gun fire stopped the advance. On 8 July, German counter-barrage on the lines of the 36th Brigade west of Ovillers caused many casualties; at 8:30 a.m., the British attacked behind a creeping barrage and quickly took the first three German trenches. Many prisoners were taken in the German dugouts where they had been surprised by the speed of the British advance. IR 186, II Battalion, Guard Fusiliers and Recruit Battalion 180 lost 1,400 casualties and withdrew to the second German trench behind outposts and into the middle of the village.

In the early hours of 9 July, the 36th Brigade was reinforced by two battalions and tried to bomb forward but was impeded by deep mud. The attackers struggled forward 200 yd (180 m) into the village and the 74th Brigade bombed up communication trenches south-west of the village, reaching the church. At 8:00 p.m., the 74th Brigade attacked again and a battalion advanced stealthily to reach the next trench by surprise, then advanced another 600 yd (550 m) by mistake and found itself under a British barrage, until the artillery-fire was stopped and both trenches consolidated. Before dawn, the 14th Brigade of the 32nd Division relieved the 12th (Eastern) Division, which had lost 4,721 casualties, since 1 July. The German defenders took advantage of the maze of ruins, trenches, dug-outs and shell-holes to keep close British positions so that British artillery-fire passed beyond them. From 9 to 10 July, three battalions of the 14th Brigade managed to advance a short distance on the left side of the village.

=== 10–17 July ===
A battalion of the 75th Brigade (25th Division) attacked from the south, as the 7th Brigade tried to get forward from the Albert–Bapaume road. The troops advanced along a trench which led behind the village and were counter-attacked several times. The 96th Brigade managed an advance overnight, into the north-west of the village. On the night of 12/13 July, two battalions attacked from the south-east and south as the 96th Brigade attacked from the west, got forward a short distance and took a number of prisoners. During the night of 13/14 July, the Reserve Army divisions of X Corps, either side of the Albert–Bapaume road, continued attacks at Ovillers. The 3rd Worcestershire, 7th Brigade, 25th Division, moved up a trench across the road, to try to close in from the north-east. From the south-east, the 10th Cheshire (7th Brigade) was repulsed but the 8th Border (75th Brigade) on the left managed a small advance and the 1st Dorset (14th Brigade (32nd Division), also managed to get forward on the west side. To the north-west, battalions of the 96th and 97th brigades, attacked with hand-grenades and took a small amount of ground.

The 10th Cheshire tried a daylight attack on Ovillers but was repulsed by machine-gun fire and the 1/7th Royal Warwick (48th Division), tried to exploit the success of the 3rd Worcester but failed. The Cheshire attacked again at 11:00 p.m. and captured the objective but casualties were so high that they had to withdraw. At 2:00 a.m. on 15 July, the 25th Division attacked Ovillers again, from the north-east, east and south, with the 32nd Division attacking from the south-west but the garrison repulsed the attack. German attacks on the Leipzig Salient to the north were defeated and during the night, the 32nd Division was relieved by 144th Brigade of the 48th Division. At 1:00 a.m. on 16 July, the 143rd Brigade (under the command of the 25th Division) attacked from the north-east, the 74th Brigade of the 25th Division and the 144th Brigade attacked from the east and south. During the evening the last Germans in Ovillers surrendered and 128 men of II Battalion, RIR 15 and the Guard Fusilier Regiment were taken prisoner. The 145th Brigade of the 48th Division took over and another 300 yd (270 m) of trench was captured on 17 July.

== Aftermath ==
=== Analysis ===
The troops of IR 180 and parties from RIR 110 had defeated the 8th Division attack and restored the front line by the afternoon, only needing three platoons of the 8th Company from reserve. Co-operation within the regiment and with its neighbours had been a great success. The two machine-guns north of IR 180 fired 9,000 rounds at the 70th Brigade, which had great effect in defeating its attacks and prevented the 8th Division from holding any of its lodgements. Much of the German artillery fired in support of the defenders of the Thiepval Spur but some continued to fire in support of IR 180 all day, the ammunition expenditure being so high that empties got in the way of the guns. Ammunition supply was sufficient and from 24 to 30 June, the column supplying I Battalion, Reserve Foot Artillery Regiment 27 delivered 19,000 rounds of ammunition.

On 1 July, deliveries began after 8:00 a.m. despite British artillery-observation aircraft directing the British guns onto the German gun positions and another 4,400 shells were carried up. The trench lines at Ovillers area were the result of two years' work and dominated ground which had no cover from small-arms fire. The British made a tactical mistake in not attacking the most northern part of the IR 180 defences, which allowed the defenders to enfilade the 70th Brigade and the 32nd Division, unopposed. A lull came after the 8th Division attacks ended but IR 180 worked on the defences for another attack, repairing wire and trenches, linking shell-hole positions by saps. By 4:00 p.m. German supply parties had evaded British shelling and brought up enough hand-grenades, ammunition and rations to resist another attack.

In 2005, Prior and Wilson wrote that the III Corps artillery plan failed in all respects, because once the barrage lifted off the German front line, it played no further part on the battle. For the last thirty minutes before zero, only field artillery shells fell on the German front defences. The attempt by the 7th Brigade to lurk forward before zero hour failed, because the destructive bombardment had been ineffective and some units had 70 percent casualties before the attack began. When the defenders concentrated on the 8th Division battalions to the south and the 32nd Division to the north, the 70th Brigade got into the German positions but there the advance broke down. Once the attacks on the flanks had been destroyed, German machine-gunners resumed fire against the remnants of the 70th Brigade and prevented other battalions from crossing no man's land. Messages sent from the front line to get the barrage brought back never arrived and of 2,720 men in the 70th Brigade attack, fewer than 600 were left the next day. Losses in the battalions of the 23rd and 25th brigades, ranged from 53 percent to 92.5 percent.

Tuson wrote later that the attack failed because the brigade had lost its artillery support, it being pointless to bombard distant objectives when the infantry could not advance beyond the German first position. Tuson proposed to make the artillery plan dependent in the progress of the infantry

I have seen the "hooroosh" time-table programme tried upon several occasions in this war, and I have never seen it successful beyond the first two or three trenches. And never expect to.

— Tuson

and in 2009, J. P. Harris called the attack an "unmitigated disaster". William Philpott described the operations on the Somme from the river to Ovillers after 1 July as a desperate fight "to the last man" by the Germans to hold back the British, while fresh divisions were moved to the Somme to man the second position; the beginning of the process which ground down the Westheer, the German army on the Western Front.

=== Casualties ===
In 2013, Whitehead recorded that on 1 July, the 8th Division had 5,121 casualties and that in the Ovillers sector, IR 180 lost 83 men killed, 184 wounded and 13 missing; the 10th Company, IR 110 had about 35 casualties against the 8th Division. From 1 July to its relief, the 12th (Eastern) Division suffered 4,721 casualties.

=== Subsequent operations ===
Ovillers was re-captured by the Germans on 25 March 1918, after a retreat by the 47th Division and the 12th (Eastern) Division during Operation Michael, the German spring offensive. In the afternoon, air reconnaissance saw that the British defence of the line from Montauban and Ervillers was collapsing and the RFC squadrons in the area made a maximum effort to disrupt the German advance. The German garrison in the village ruins and vicinity resisted an attack on 24 August but were by-passed on both flanks by the 38th Division two days later, during the Second Battle of Bapaume and retreated before they could be surrounded.

== See also ==
- Capture of La Boisselle
- Ovillers-la-Boisselle in World War I
