= Conrad von Schubert =

Prussian lieutenant general and politician

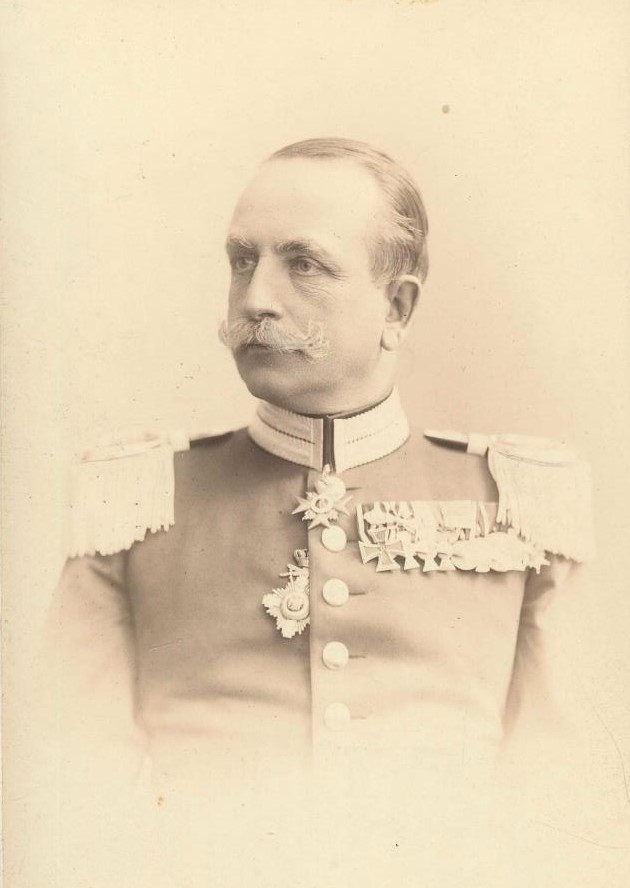
- Born: Philipp Christian Theodor Conrad von Schubert; 29 October 1847; Wielki Bór, Grand Duchy of Posen, Kingdom of Prussia
- Died: 21 January 1924 (aged 76); Berlin, Weimar Republic
- Spouse(s): Ida, Baroness von Stumm-Halberg (m. 1881; died 1916)
- Children: 7
- Relatives: Richard von Schubert (brother)

Philipp Christian Theodor Conrad von Schubert (29 October 1847 – 21 January 1924) was a Prussian lieutenant general, politician, winery owner and member of the German Reichstag.

== Early life ==
Schubert was born on 29 October 1847 in Wielki Bór, in the Prussian Grand Duchy of Posen (now Poland),. He was the son of Theodor Schubert (1816–1890), Lord of Bogislawitz, Rachelsdorf, Koschine, Kalmow and his wife Amalie (née Lebius). His younger brother Richard von Schubert served as a German army commander during the First World War.

Schubert attended high school in Ostrowo.

== Career ==
Schubert joined the Pioneer Battalion No. 7 in Koblenz in 1865 as a one-year volunteer, taking part in the Austro-Prussian War of 1866 as a non-commissioned officer. He fought in the Battles of Münchengrätz and Königgrätz. In November 1867, he was transferred to the 3rd Engineering Inspectorate as a Second lieutenant. He attended the United Artillery and Engineering School from October 1868 to July 1870. During the Franco-Prussian War, Schubert was transferred to the Electoral Hessian Pioneer Battalion No. 11, with which he took part in the Battles of Wissembourg, Wörth, Sedan and the Siege of Paris. Schubert was wounded at Sedan and was awarded the Iron Cross, 2nd Class in 1870.

After the end of the war, Schubert was promoted to Battalion adjutant in April 1872 and was shortly afterwards promoted to First lieutenant in July 1872. In 1873 he took part in the General Staff trip of the XI Army Corps and was assigned to the staff of the 21st Division as an orderly officer. From February 1874 to January 1876, Schubert was adjutant of the 3rd Pioneer Inspectorate and then came to the Strasbourg fortification. Schubert was assigned to the General Staff for a year. He was promoted to captain in June 1879. On September 13, 1884, Schubert was appointed company commander in the Guard Pioneer Battalion of the Imperial German Army. He became major in April 1888 and Commander of the Battalion in November 1889. In April 1893, he was made Lieutenant colonel and was appointed commander in February 1895. On 20 May 1896 he was promoted to Colonel. For his services, Schubert was raised to the hereditary Prussian nobility on 15 January 1899. In June 1899, Schubert was appointed Commander and on 3 July 1899, he was promoted to Major general before becoming Lieutenant general on 12 September 1902, leading the brigade for the next three years. He retired in December 1902.

In June 1913, Schubert was awarded the uniform of the Guard Pioneer Battalion on the occasion of the 25th anniversary of the reign of Emperor Wilhelm II.

=== Political career ===
From 1903 to 1918, he was a member of the Prussian House of Representatives and from 1907 to 1912 he was a member of the German Reichstag for the constituency of Trier (Ottweiler, St. Wendel, Meisenheim). In the Reichstag he was an affiliated with the National Liberals.

After the death of his father-in-law in 1901, he became deputy chairman of the supervisory board of Stumm Brothers GmbH in 1903 as a representative of the heirs.

== Personal life ==
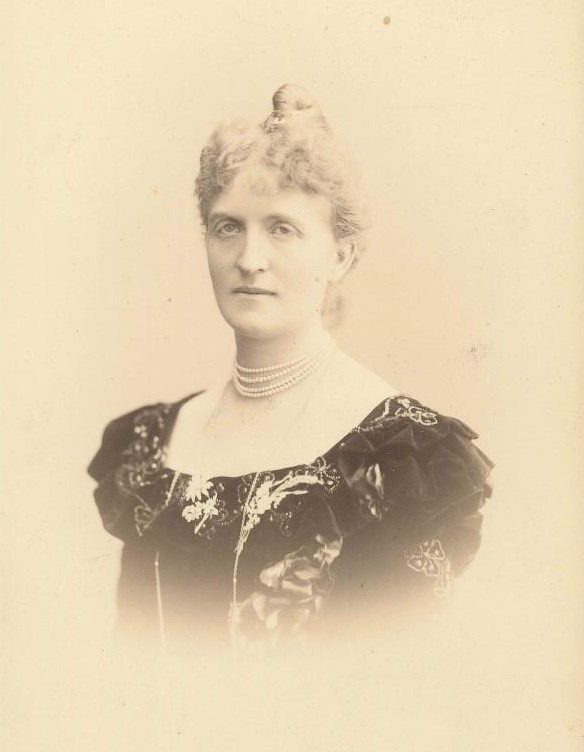
Photograph of his wife, Ida, Baroness von Stumm-Halberg, c. 1900

On 22 August 1881, Schubert married Ida Louise Henriette von Stumm (5 April 1861 – 22 February 1916), the eldest daughter of the industrialist and politician Carl Ferdinand von Stumm, who brought the Maximin Grünhaus winery in Mertesdorf, Mosel, which was later named after him, into the marriage. Together, they were the parents of seven children, including:

- Carl von Schubert (1882–1947), the State Secretary in the Foreign Office under Gustav Stresemann who became Ambassador to Italy; he married Renata von Harrach, a daughter of the painter Ferdinand von Harrach.
- Andreas von Schubert, who became a Commander of the Order of St. John.
- Helene von Schubert (1890–1970), who married Count Bolko von Roedern (1882–1922). After his death, she married Vicco von Bülow-Schwante, head of the German section of the Foreign Office.
- Irmgard von Schubert (1892–1972), who married Silesian landowner Count Max-Erdmann Roedern (1884–1946).
- Ida von Schubert (1895–1971), who married Potsdam police chief Wilhelm von Wedel and moved to Canada.
- Conrad von Schubert (1901–1973), who also became a diplomat; he married Claudia Naumann.

Schubert died on 21 January 1924 in Berlin.
