= 70th Siege Battery, Royal Garrison Artillery =

70th Siege Battery, RGA
- Cap Badge of the Royal Regiment of Artillery
- Active: 9 October 1915–1919
- Country: United Kingdom
- Branch: British Army
- Role: Siege Artillery
- Part of: Royal Garrison Artillery
- Engagements: Battle of the Somme; Battle of Vimy Ridge; Battle of Cambrai; Battle of St Quentin Canal; Battle of the Selle; Battle of the Sambre

70th Siege Battery, was a heavy howitzer unit of the Royal Garrison Artillery (RGA) formed during World War I. It saw active service on the Western Front at the Somme, Vimy Ridge and Cambrai, against the German spring offensive, and in the final Hundred Days Offensive.

== Mobilisation ==
70th Siege Battery was formed at Dover under War Office Instruction No 144 of 9 October 1915 from one company (probably 1/4th Company) of the Forth Royal Garrison Artillery, a part-time coast defence unit of the Territorial Force based in Edinburgh, Scotland. The remainder of the personnel were New Army recruits. The battery went out to the Western Front on 26 March 1916 armed with four 8-inch howitzers. (At this stage of the war the 8-inch howitzers in use (Marks I–V) were improvised from cut-down and bored-out barrels of 6-inch coast defence guns, with the recoil checked by enormous wooden wedges.) It joined the Northern Heavy Group (40th Heavy Artillery Group or HAG) in X Corps. This Corps was part of Fourth Army preparing for that summer's 'Big Push' (the Battle of the Somme).

== Service ==
=== Somme ===
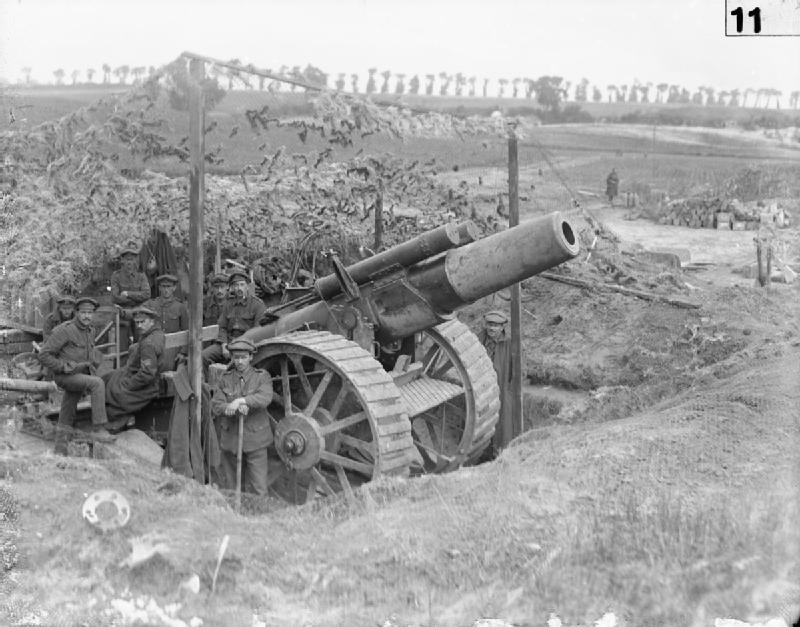
8-inch Howitzer Mk I on the Somme, July 1916.

The role of the northern division of X Corps, the 36th (Ulster) Division, was to attack astride the River Ancre and capture the Schwaben Redoubt on the edge of the Thiepval Ridge overlooking the Ancre. The preliminary bombardment programme was to extend over five days, U, V, W, X and Y, before the assault was launched on Z day. The strenuous work of firing the heavy guns and howitzers was divided into 2-hour periods to allow the gunners to rest, Forward Observation Officers (FOOs) to be relieved, and the guns to cool. The bombardment began on 24 June, but on several days the weather was too bad for good air or ground observation and the programme was extended by two days (Y1 and Y2).

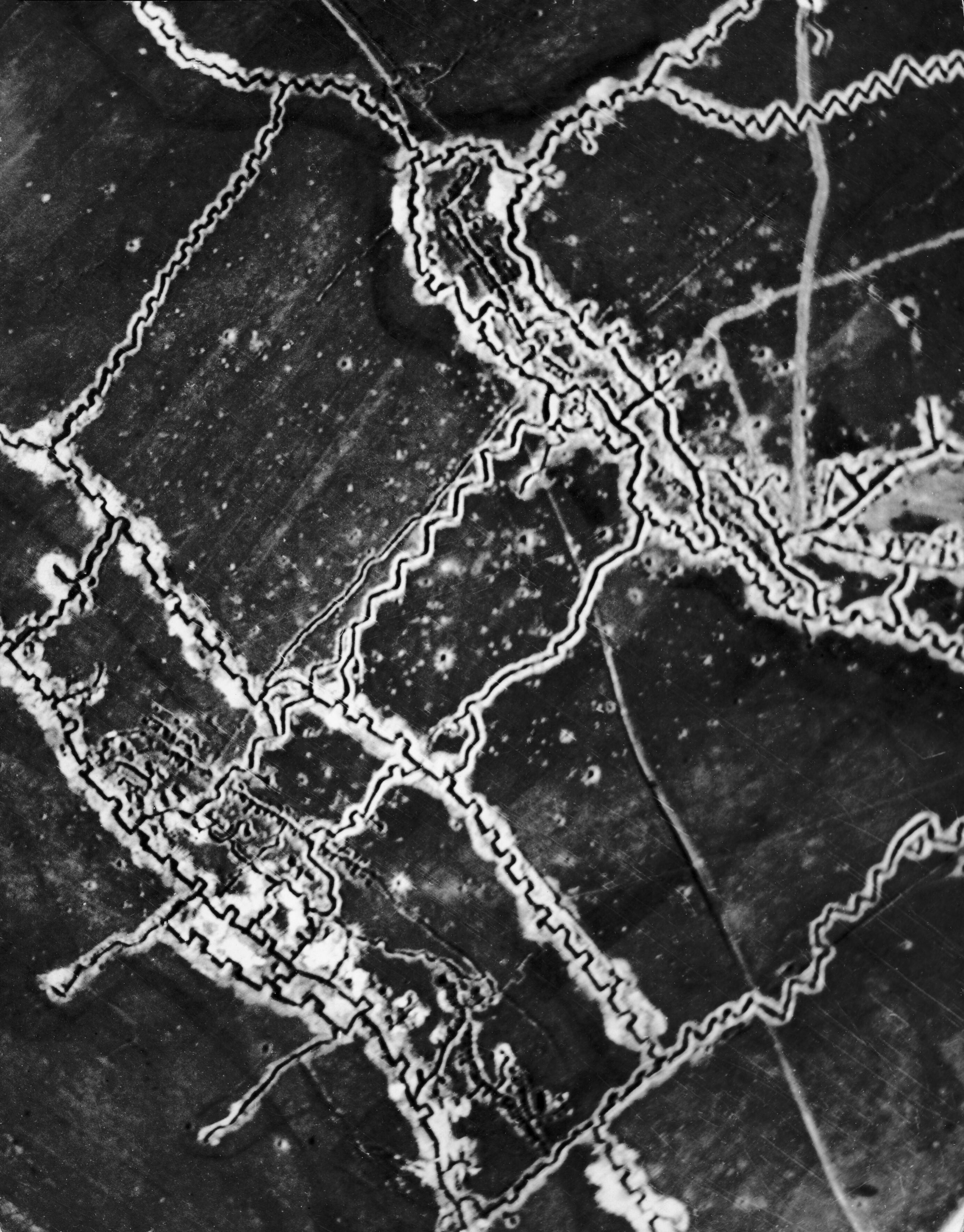
British aerial photograph of German trenches north of Thiepval; Schwaben Redoubt is the network of trenches in the upper right of the photograph.

At 06.25 on Z Day (1 July) the final bombardment began. When the infantry launched their assault at 07.30, the heavy guns lifted to successive targets, repeating the process six times. On 36th Division's front the initial assault was entirely successful, except for the area immediately adjacent to the Ancre. The Ulstermen overran the German front line trenches and dugouts, and by 08.00 they had captured the front face of the Schwaben Redoubt. They were ordered not to continue the attack, because the divisions on either flank had met with disaster, and this allowed the defenders to get into their rear. The reserve brigade had already gone on, however, and although some parties got into the German 2nd Position, the remainder were pinned down in the open. Communications had broken down so the artillery could do little to help. The partial success of 36th Division was not supported, and German counter-attacks made the position in the Schwaben untenable: the surviving troops were withdrawn in good order after dark. The artillery helped to evacuate the wounded, a process that was not completed until 3 July.

The Somme Offensive continued, with some success for X Corps on 14 July (the Battle of Bazentin Ridge), 17 July (the Capture of Ovillers) and 23 July (the Capture of Pozières. The front was then reorganised, with Reserve Army (later Fifth Army) taking over the sector from Fourth Army and X Corps HQ handing over to II Corps. There as no respite for the gunners: II Corps continued the Battle of Pozières Ridge until early September and was then engaged in the battles of Flers-Courcelette (15–22 September) and Thiepval Ridge (26–28 September), with the heavy guns increasingly concentrated to help the infantry advance. On 3 October 70th Siege Bty transferred to 16th HAG, still with Fifth Army, which continued to attack on the Ancre Heights until mid-November, and minor operations there through the winter.

=== Vimy ===
On 22 March 1917, 70th Siege Bty moved north to join 31st HAG with First Army, which was preparing for the Battle of Vimy Ridge. 31st HAG was assigned to I Corps with its batteries firing from around Bully Grenay on the extreme north flank of the attack, from where they could virtually enfilade the German lines. The artillery plan for the heavy guns emphasised counter-battery (CB) fire. At Zero hour, while the field guns laid down a Creeping barrage to protect the advancing infantry, the heavy howitzers fired 450 yards (410 m) further ahead to hit the rear areas on the reverse slope of the ridge, especially known gun positions. The attack went in on 9 April with I Corps and Canadian Corps successfully capturing Vimy Ridge while Third Army attacked further south near Arras. The only hold-up on 9 April was at Hill 145, near the north end of the Canadian attack, and the capture of this position was completed the next day. Fighting in the southern sector (the Battle of Arras) continued into May.

70th Siege Bty came under the command of 15th HAG on 11 May 1917, and on 29 May it was joined by a section from the newly arrived 310th Siege Bty, bringing it up to a strength of six 8-inch howitzers. This had been formed on 12 December 1916 at Portsmouth under Army Council Instruction 2379 of 20 December and had arrived on the Western Front with four 8-inch howitzers on 18 May 1917. It joined I Corps on 26 May and had been immediately broken up, one section going to 70th Siege Bty, the other to 169th Siege Bty.

70th Siege Bty transferred again to 54th HAG on 23 June while First Army was engaged around Oppy Wood, then to 63rd HAG on 4 July and finally to 12th HAG with Third Army on 7 September.

=== Cambrai ===
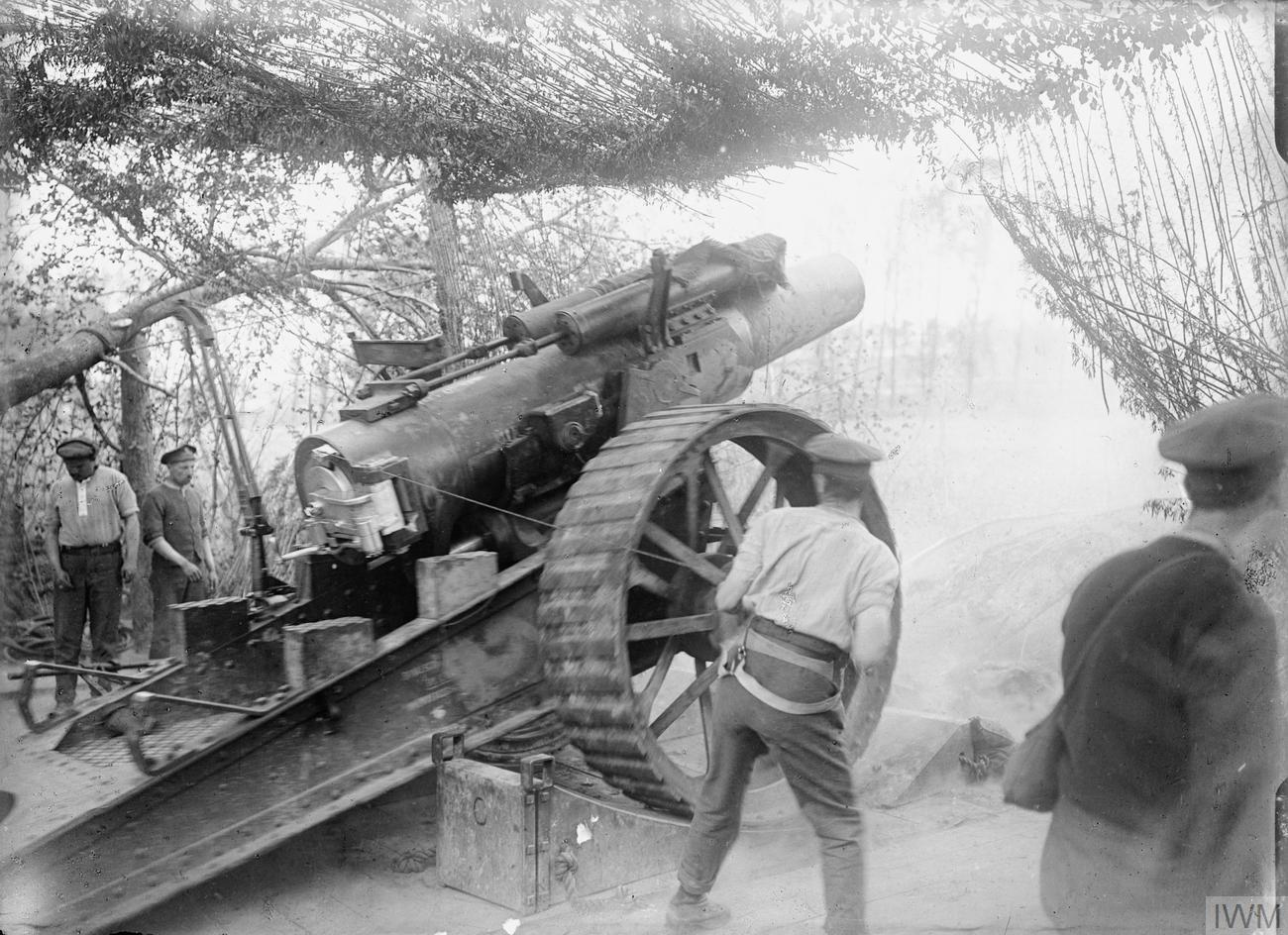
8-inch Howitzer at almost full recoil.

In October, Third Army began preparing for its surprise attack with tanks at the Battle of Cambrai. There was to be no preliminary bombardment or registration shots, and the guns were to open fire at Zero hour firing 'off the map' at carefully surveyed targets. Third Army HQ stressed that even a single 8-inch howitzer 'would frequently be the quickest and always the least expensive way of expelling the enemy from a village or strong point which could not be by-passed'. When the battle began with a crash of artillery at 06.20 on 20 November the German defenders were stunned, and the massed tanks completed their overcome. In most areas the attack was an outstanding success. Exploitation over succeeding days was less spectacular, though some bombardments were set up to help the infantry take certain villages.

By now HAG allocations were becoming more fixed, and on 1 February 1918 they were converted into permanent RGA brigades. Because of the inclusion of 70th Siege Bty the 12th Brigade was defined as an 8-inch Howitzer Brigade, though the other three batteries were all equipped with 6-inch howitzers. 70th Siege Bty remained with this brigade until the Armistice.

=== 1918 ===
12th Brigade was in General Headquarters (GHQ) Reserve from 4 January to 11 February 1918. Thereafter it was assigned to the reconstituted Second Army. The brigade was part of IX Corps' Heavy Artillery in the fighting at Mont Kemmel, during the Battle of the Lys (the second phase of the German spring offensive) in April 1918. It then moved to Fourth Amy on 18 August 1918 in time for the Battle of Amiens and then to participate in the victorious Hundred Days Offensive.

By the end of September Fourth Army had closed up to the Hindenburg Line. 12th Brigade came under the command of IX Corps once more for Fourth Army's assault crossing of the St Quentin Canal on 29 September. The canal defences had largely been destroyed by the heavy guns, which continued firing on the canal banks until the last possible moment as 137th (Staffordshire) Brigade stormed the outpost line and then scrambled across the canal in the morning mist. The objectives were taken by 15.30 and 70th Siege Bty moved forwards to new positions before the end of the day. It crossed over the canal after dawn on 1 October to support 32nd Division's attack on the Beaurevoir Line the following day.

It took a week for Fourth Army to bring up its heavy guns and ammunition for its next attack (the Battle of the Selle). 12th Brigade was still with IX Corps HQ, who selected important localities to be bombarded by 70th Siege Bty's heavy howitzers, for which 200 rounds of ammunition per gun were accumulated. IX Corps attacked on 17 October, 'lifted forward' by two great belts of intense and heavy artillery fire leapfrogging forward, and an attempted German counter-attack was hit by every gun within range. When the infantry were brought to a halt by machine gun fire, the guns were being moved forwards, but a new barrage was improvised and they ended the day overlooking the Selle valley.

IX Corps renewed its advance on 23 October, with 12th Bde part of a massive corps artillery reserve. The attack went in at 01.20 in moonlight, after the heavy guns had done the usual CB and harassing fire (HF) bombardments, and the results were extremely satisfactory. As the regimental historian relates, "The guns of Fourth Army demonstrated, on 23rd October, the crushing effect of well co-ordinated massed artillery. They simply swept away the opposition". After a pause to regroup and reconnoitre, IX Corps stormed across the Sambre–Oise Canal on 4 November (the Battle of the Sambre). After that the campaign became a pursuit of a beaten enemy, in which the slow-moving siege guns could play no part. The war ended with the Armistice with Germany on 11 November.

70th Siege Battery was disbanded in 1919.
