= Wielki Bór, Greater Poland Voivodeship =

Wielki Bór
- Settlement
- Location within Poland
- Coordinates: 51°37′59″N 17°11′51″E
- Country: Poland
- Voivodeship: Greater Poland
- County: Rawicz
- Gmina: Jutrosin

Wielki Bór (Polish pronunciation: [ˈvjɛlkʲi ˈbur]) is a settlement in the administrative district of Gmina Jutrosin, within Rawicz County, Greater Poland Voivodeship, in west-central Poland.
