= Richard von Schubert =

Adolf Louis Theodor Richard von Schubert
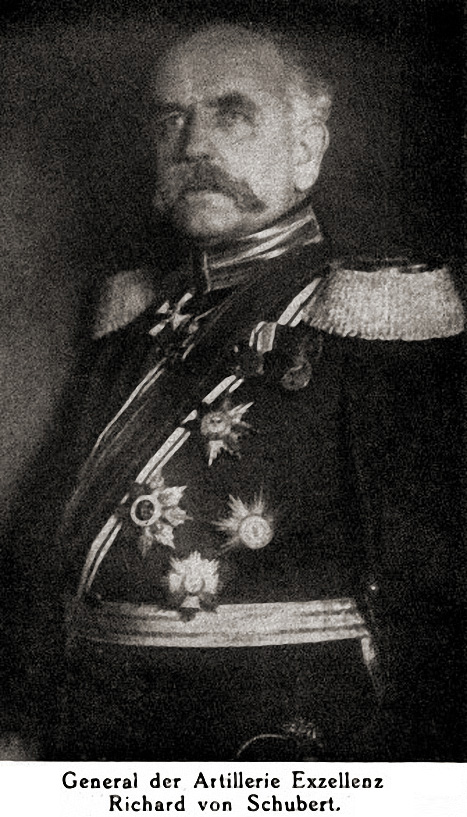
- Born: 19 April 1850; Wielkibor
- Died: 13 May 1933 (aged 83); Marburg
- Relatives: Conrad von Schubert (brother)
- Military career
- Allegiance: Prussia
- Branch: Prussian Army
- Service years: 1867–1917
- Rank: Generaloberst
- Commands: 8th Army; 7th Army
- Conflicts: World War I: Battle of Mulhouse; Battle of Lorraine; First Battle of Ypres; Second Battle of Ypres
- Awards: Pour le Mérite (1916), Order of the Black Eagle (1917), Knight Grand Cross of the Order of the Red Eagle (1917)

Adolf Louis Theodor Richard von Schubert (19 April 1850 – 13 May 1933) served as a German army commander during the First World War.

== Career ==
Schubert participated as a second lieutenant in the Franco-Prussian War. In 1875, he graduated at the Prussian military academy in Berlin and served in 1888 on the Imperial German General Staff. In 1902, he became commander of the 39th Division and in 1906 Governor of the Fortress of Ulm. In 1907, he became Inspector General of Field Artillery and was promoted to General of the Artillery. On 27 January 1909, he was ennobled by Wilhelm II, in his capacity as King of Prussia and afterwards known as "Richard von Schubert". He retired in 1911.

=== First World War ===
Upon mobilization in August 1914, Schubert was recalled from retirement and given command of the German XIV Reserve Corps. His Corps participated in the Battle of Mulhouse and the Battle of Lorraine, as part of the 7th Army.

In September 1914, Schubert was sent to the Eastern Front to take over the command of the 8th Army from Paul von Hindenburg. Here he ordered a withdrawal, following the First Battle of the Masurian Lakes. Hermann von François refused, and dispatched a telegram to the OHL stating Schubert was badly advised. The telegram impressed the Kaiser so much that he immediately relieved Schubert and gave François the command of the 8th Army.

Schubert was sent back to the Western Front, where he replaced Adolph von Carlowitz at the head of the XXVII Reserve Corps during the First Battle of Ypres. In August 1916, he succeeded Josias von Heeringen as commander of the 7th Army. On 27 January 1917, he was promoted to generaloberst and on 11 March 1917, he was relieved of command and sent into retirement.

== Additional Reading ==
- Prussian Machine
- Deutsche kriegsgeschichte

Military offices
Preceded by Paul von Hindenburg	Commander, 8th Army; 18 September – 9 October 1914	Succeeded by Hermann von François
Preceded by Josias von Heeringen	Commander, 7th Army; 28 August 1916 – 11 March 1917	Succeeded by Max von Boehn
