= 26th Reserve Division =

Military unit of the Imperial German Army in World War I

26th Reserve Division (26. Reserve-Division)
- Active: 1914-1919
- Country: Württemberg/Germany
- Branch: Army
- Type: Infantry
- Size: Approx. 15,000
- Engagements: World War I: Battle of the Frontiers, Race to the Sea, Somme, Arras, German spring offensive, Hundred Days Offensive

The 26th Reserve Division (26. Reserve-Division) was a unit of the Imperial German Army in World War I. The division was formed on the mobilization of the German Army in August 1914 as part of the XIV Reserve Corps. The division was disbanded in 1919 during the demobilization of the German Army after World War I. The division was raised in the Kingdom of Württemberg.

== Combat chronicle ==
The 26th Reserve Division spent World War I on the Western Front. It fought in the Battle of the Frontiers and then participated in the Race to the Sea, fighting in the Somme region. It occupied the line in the Somme/Artois region into 1916, facing the British offensive in the Battle of the Somme. It was relieved from the Somme in October 1916 and spent the winter of 1916–1917 in Artois. In 1917, it fought in the Battle of Arras. In 1918, it fought in the German spring offensive and against the subsequent Allied offensives and counteroffensives. Allied intelligence rated the division as first class.

== Order of battle on mobilization ==
The order of battle of the 26th Reserve Division on mobilization was as follows:

- 51. Reserve-Infanterie-Brigade
  - 10. Württembergisches Infanterie-Regiment Nr. 180
  - Württembergisches Reserve-Infanterie-Regiment Nr. 121
- 52. Reserve-Infanterie-Brigade
  - Württembergisches Reserve-Infanterie-Regiment Nr. 119
  - Württembergisches Reserve-Infanterie-Regiment Nr. 120
- Württembergisches Reserve-Dragoner-Regiment
- Württembergisches Reserve-Feldartillerie-Regiment Nr. 26
- 4. Kompanie/Württembergisches Pionier-Bataillon Nr. 13

== Order of battle on March 20, 1918 ==
The 26th Reserve Division was triangularized in January 1917. Over the course of the war, other changes took place, including the formation of artillery and signals commands and a pioneer battalion. The order of battle on March 20, 1918, was as follows:

- 51. Reserve-Infanterie-Brigade
  - Württembergisches Reserve-Infanterie-Regiment Nr. 119
  - Württembergisches Reserve-Infanterie-Regiment Nr. 121
  - 10. Württembergisches Infanterie-Regiment Nr. 180
  - Maschinengewehr-Scharfschützen-Abteilung Nr. 54
- 2. Eskadron/Ulanen-Regiment König Wilhelm I (2. Württembergisches) Nr. 20
- Artillerie-Kommandeur 122
  - Württembergisches Reserve-Feldartillerie-Regiment Nr. 26
  - Fußartillerie-Bataillon Nr. 59
- Pionier-Bataillon Nr. 326
  - 4. Kompanie/Württembergisches Pionier-Bataillon Nr. 13
  - 6. Kompanie/Württembergisches Pionier-Bataillon Nr. 13
  - Minenwerfer-Kompanie Nr. 226
- Divisions-Nachrichten-Kommandeur 426
