= XIV Reserve Corps =

German military unit in World War I

XIV Reserve Corps XIV. Reserve-Korps
- Flag of the Staff of a Generalkommando (1871–1918)
- Active: 2 August 1914 - post November 1918
- Country: German Empire
- Type: Corps
- Size: Approximately 38,000 (on formation)
- Engagements: World War I Battle of the Frontiers

Insignia
- Abbreviation: XIV RK

The XIV Reserve Corps (German: XIV. Reserve-Korps / XIV RK) was a corps level command of the German Army in World War I.

== Formation ==
XIV Reserve Corps was formed on the outbreak of the war in August 1914 as part of the mobilisation of the Army. It was initially commanded by General der Artillerie Richard von Schubert, brought out of retirement. It was still in existence at the end of the war in the 17th Army, Heeresgruppe Kronprinz Rupprecht on the Western Front.

=== Structure on formation ===
On formation in August 1914, XIV Reserve Corps consisted of two divisions, made up of reserve units. In general, Reserve Corps and Reserve Divisions were weaker than their active counterparts

Reserve Infantry Regiments did not always have three battalions nor necessarily contain a machine gun company
Reserve Jäger Battalions did not have a machine gun company on formation
Reserve Cavalry Regiments consisted of just three squadrons
Reserve Field Artillery Regiments usually consisted of two abteilungen of three batteries each.
Corps Troops generally consisted of a Telephone Detachment and four sections of munition columns and trains

In summary, XIV Reserve Corps mobilised with 26 infantry battalions, 7 machine gun companies (42 machine guns), 6 cavalry squadrons, 12 field artillery batteries (72 guns) and 3 pioneer companies. 26th Reserve Division was formed by units drawn from the XIII Corps District (Württemberg). It included one active Infantry Regiment (180th).

Corps	Division	Brigade	Units
XIV Reserve Corps	26th Reserve Division	51st Reserve Infantry Brigade	180th Infantry Regiment
XIV Reserve Corps	26th Reserve Division	51st Reserve Infantry Brigade	121st Reserve Infantry Regiment
XIV Reserve Corps	26th Reserve Division	52nd Reserve Infantry Brigade	119th Reserve Infantry Regiment
XIV Reserve Corps	26th Reserve Division	52nd Reserve Infantry Brigade	120th Reserve Infantry Regiment
XIV Reserve Corps	26th Reserve Division		Württemberg Reserve Dragoon Regiment
XIV Reserve Corps	26th Reserve Division		26th Reserve Field Artillery Regiment
XIV Reserve Corps	26th Reserve Division		4th Company, 13th Pioneer Battalion
XIV Reserve Corps	26th Reserve Division		26th Reserve Divisional Pontoon Train
XIV Reserve Corps	26th Reserve Division		Württemberg Reserve Medical Company
XIV Reserve Corps	28th Reserve Division	55th Reserve Infantry Brigade	40th Reserve Infantry Regiment
XIV Reserve Corps	28th Reserve Division	55th Reserve Infantry Brigade	109th Reserve Infantry Regiment
XIV Reserve Corps	28th Reserve Division	55th Reserve Infantry Brigade	8th Reserve Jäger Battalion
XIV Reserve Corps	28th Reserve Division	56th Reserve Infantry Brigade	110th Reserve Infantry Regiment
XIV Reserve Corps	28th Reserve Division	56th Reserve Infantry Brigade	111th Reserve Infantry Regiment
XIV Reserve Corps	28th Reserve Division	56th Reserve Infantry Brigade	14th Reserve Jäger Battalion
XIV Reserve Corps	28th Reserve Division		8th Reserve Dragoon Regiment
XIV Reserve Corps	28th Reserve Division		29th Reserve Field Artillery Regiment
XIV Reserve Corps	28th Reserve Division		1st Reserve Company, 13th Pioneer Battalion
XIV Reserve Corps	28th Reserve Division		2nd Reserve Company, 13th Pioneer Battalion
XIV Reserve Corps	28th Reserve Division		28th Reserve Divisional Pontoon Train
XIV Reserve Corps	28th Reserve Division		14th Reserve Medical Company
XIV Reserve Corps	Corps Troops		14th Reserve Telephone Detachment
XIV Reserve Corps	Corps Troops		Munition Trains and Columns corresponding to the III Reserve Corps

== Combat chronicle ==
On mobilisation, XIV Reserve Corps was assigned to the 7th Army forming part of the right wing of the forces for the Schlieffen Plan offensive in August 1914.

== Commanders ==
XIV Reserve Corps had the following commanders during its existence:

From	Rank	Name
2 August 1914	General der Artillerie	Richard von Schubert
14 September 1914	Generalleutnant	Hermann von Stein
29 October 1916	Generalleutnant	Georg Fuchs
11 March 1917	Generalleutnant	Otto von Moser
8 February 1918	Generalleutnant	Arthur von Lindequist
15 June 1918	Generalleutnant	Richard Wellmann
24 August 1918	Generalleutnant	Kurt von Morgen

== See also ==
- German Army order of battle (1914)
- German Army order of battle, Western Front (1918)

== Bibliography ==
- Cron, Hermann (2002) [1937]. Imperial German Army 1914–18: Organisation, Structure, Orders-of-Battle (facs. repr. ed.). Warwick: Helion. ISBN 1-874622-70-1.
- Ellis, John; Cox, Michael (1993). The World War I Databook. Aurum Press. ISBN 1-85410-766-6.
- The German Forces in the Field; 7th Revision, 11th November 1918; Compiled by the General Staff, War Office. Imperial War Museum, London and the Battery Press. 1995 [1918]. ISBN 978-1-870423-95-3.
