= Mines on the first day of the Somme =

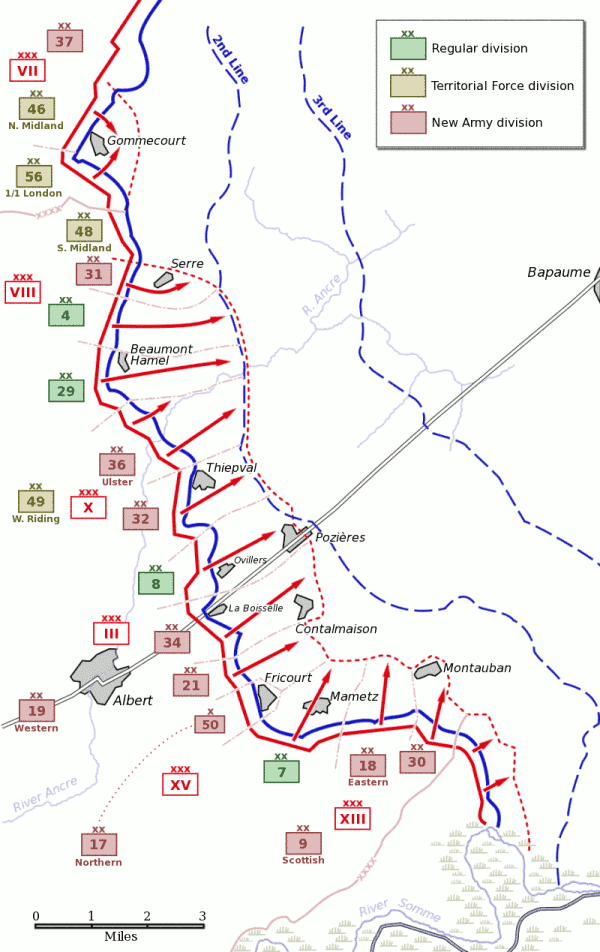
British objectives, 1 July 1916

On the morning of 1 July 1916, the first day of the Battle of the Somme during World War I, underground explosive charges planted by British tunnelling units were detonated beneath the German front lines. The joint explosion of these mines ranks among the largest artificial non-nuclear explosions.

Eight big and eleven small charges were buried deep in the chalky earth to make up the 19 mines. They were "overcharged" to throw up high lips for screening and to give advantage to the attackers if they were able to capture the resulting craters. The larger mines were located near Beaumont-Hamel beneath Hawthorn Ridge Redoubt and near La Boisselle (Lochnagar, Y Sap, and Glory Hole charges), Fricourt (Triple Tambour mines), Bulgar Point and Kasino Point. The smaller charges for removing German positions, such as machine gun posts, were laid from the ends of comparatively shallow tunnels.

In addition to the mines, the British tunnelling units also prepared a series of shallow saps extending from the British positions into the no man's land. They allowed the infantry to attack the Germans from a comparatively short distance once the battle commenced.

When they were fired, the Lochnagar and Hawthorn Ridge mines were the largest ever detonated, and reports suggest that their sound could be heard in London and beyond. The mine detonations on the first day of the Somme were surpassed by those fired at the start of the Battle of Messines the following year.

== Background ==
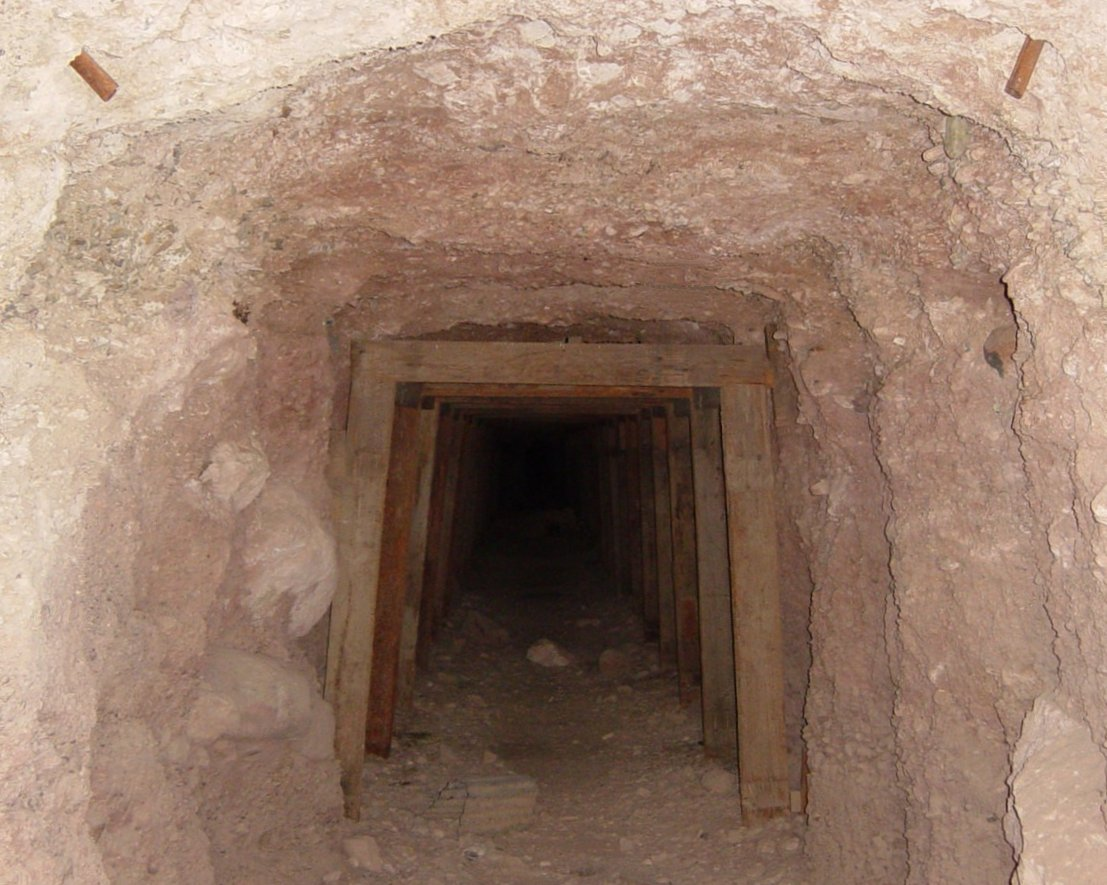
A mine gallery with timber roof support (Canada 2003)

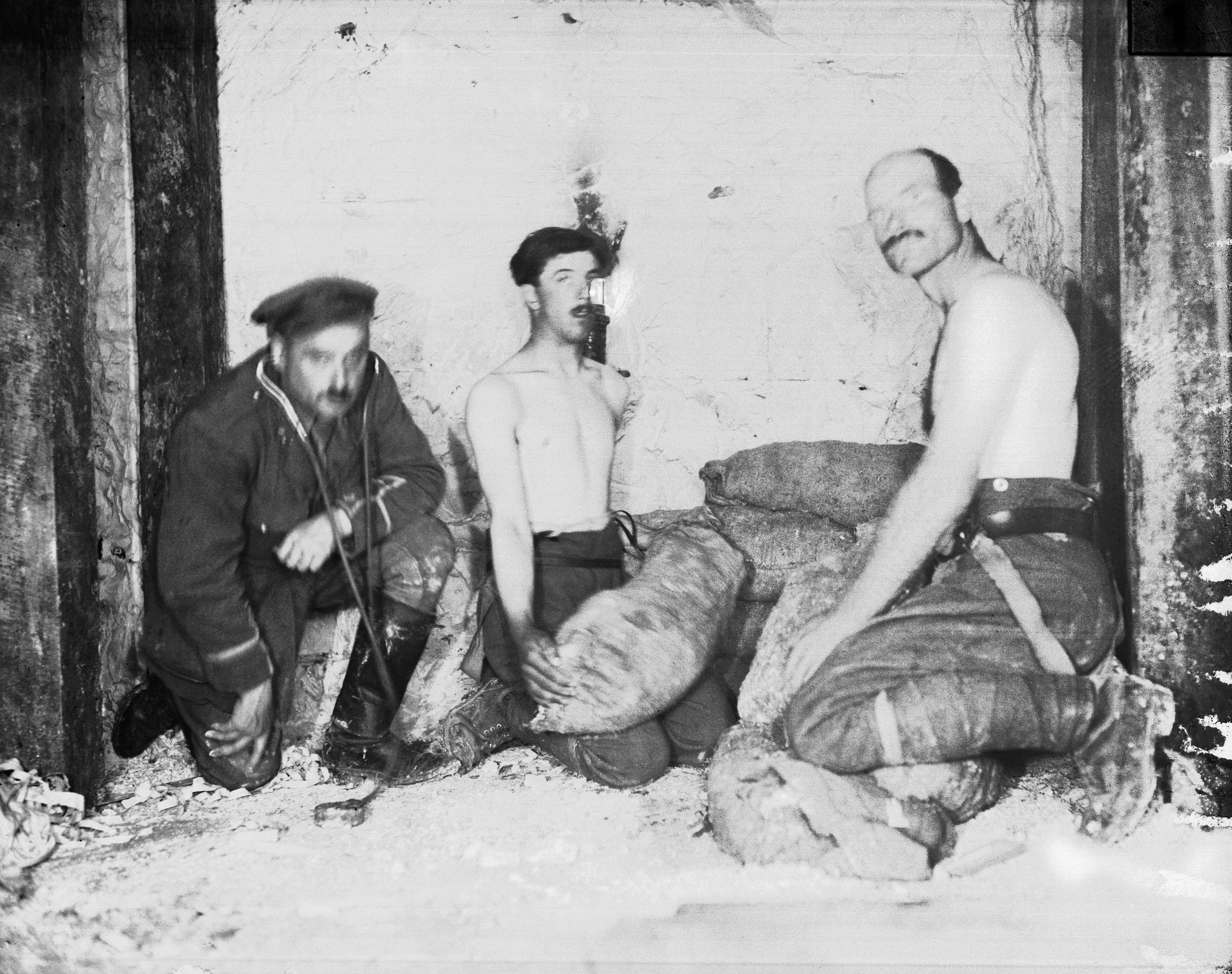
Miners laying charges for one of the mines on the Somme, 1–13 July 1916.

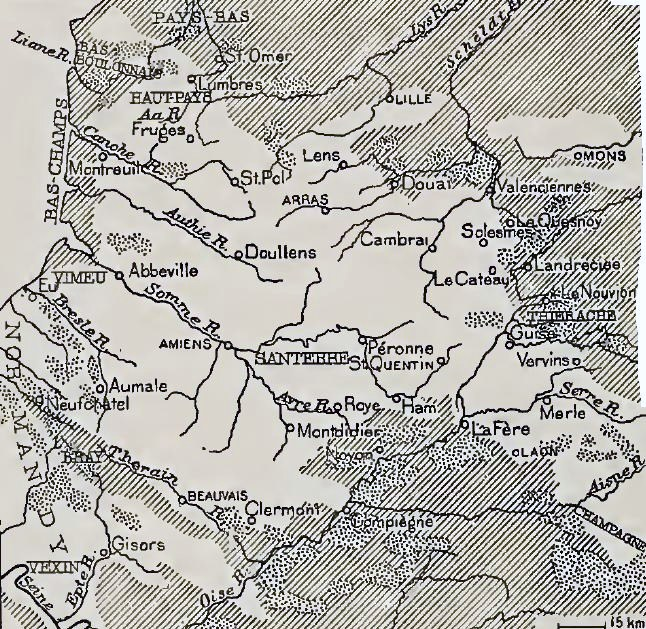
Map of chalk areas in northern France

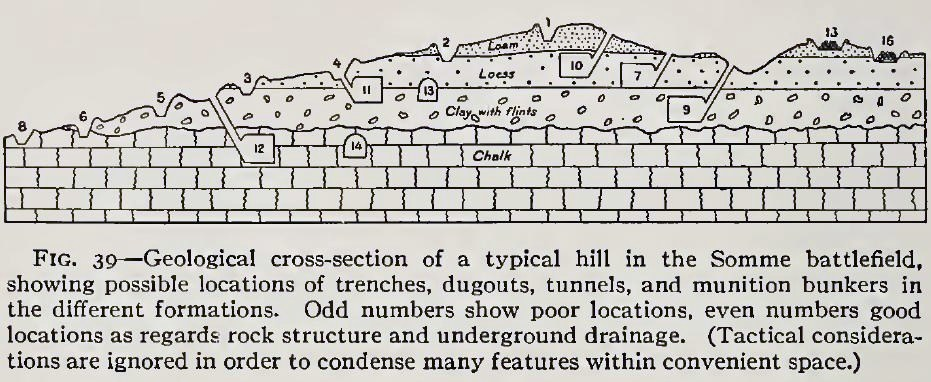
Geological cross-section of the Somme battlefield

=== 1914 ===
French and German military operations began on the Somme in September 1914. After the German advance towards Albert had been brought to a halt at La Boisselle and attempts to resume offensive warfare in October had not been successful, both sides reduced their attacks to local operations or raids and began to fortify their remaining positions with underground works. On 18 December, the French captured La Boisselle's village cemetery at the west end of a German salient and established an advanced post only 3 metres (3.3 yd) from the German front line. By 24 December, the French forced the Germans back from the cemetery and the western area of La Boisselle but their advance was stopped a short distance forward at L'îlot de La Boisselle, in front of German trenches protected by barbed wire. Once the location of a farm and a small number of buildings, L'îlot became known as Granathof (German: "shell farm") to the Germans and later as Glory Hole to the British. On Christmas Day 1914, French engineers sank a first mine shaft at La Boisselle. Local but heavy fighting underground also took place in the winter of 1914 and spring of 1915 at Fricourt, Bois Français and Carnoy.

=== 1915 ===
From January 1915 to the start of the Battle of the Somme in July 1916, L'îlot de La Boisselle was the scene of fierce underground fighting. Having started mining at La Boisselle shortly after the French, the Bavarian Engineer Regiment 1 continued digging eight galleries towards L'îlot. On 5 January, French sappers were heard digging near a gallery and a 300-kilogram (660 lb) camouflet was quickly placed in the gallery and blown, collapsing the French digging and two German galleries in the vicinity. A 600-kilogram (1,300 lb) charge was blown on 12 January, which killed more than forty French soldiers. On the night of 6/7 February, three more German mines were sprung close to L'îlot. On the night of 8/9 March, a German sapper at La Boisselle inadvertently broke into French gallery, which was found to have been charged with explosives; a group of volunteers took 45 nerve racking minutes to dismantle the charge and cut the firing cables. Between April 1915 and January 1916 alone, sixty-one mines were sprung around L'îlot, some with 20,000–25,000 kg (44,000–55,000 lb) of explosives.

In summer 1915, the French mine workings in the La Boisselle area were taken over by the Royal Engineers as the British moved into the Somme front. Great secrecy was maintained to prevent the discovery of the mines as no continuous front line trench ran through L'îlot de La Boisselle, which was defended by posts near the mine shafts. G. F. Fowke moved the 174th and 183rd Tunnelling Companies into the area, but at first the British did not have enough miners to take over the large number of French shafts; the problem was temporarily solved when the French agreed to leave their engineers at work for several weeks. On 24 July, 174th Tunnelling Company established headquarters at Bray, taking over some 66 shafts at Carnoy, Fricourt, Maricourt and La Boisselle. No man's land just south-west of La Boisselle was very narrow, at one point about 46 metres (50 yd) wide, and had become pockmarked by many chalk craters. The Germans had also dug defensive transverse tunnels about 24 metres (80 ft) long, parallel to the front line. To provide the men needed for significant counter-mining operations against the Germans, the British formed the 178th and 179th Tunnelling Companies in August, followed by the 185th and 252nd Tunnelling Companies in October. The 181st Tunnelling Company was also present on the Somme.

The British tunnelling companies dramatically increased the scale of mining operations by extending and deepening the system, first to 24 metres (79 ft) and ultimately 30 metres (98 ft). In August, the French and Germans had been working at a depth of 12 metres (39 ft); the size of their charges had reached 3,000 kilograms (6,600 lb). The underground war continued with offensive mining to destroy the opponents' strong points and defensive mining to destroy tunnels, which were 9.1–36.6 metres (30–120 ft) long. In addition to their offensive and defensive works, the Royal Engineers also dug deep wells to supply the troops with drinking water. In October, the 179th Tunnelling Company began to sink a series of deep shafts in an attempt to forestall German miners who were approaching beneath the British front line. At W Shaft they went down from 9.1 metres (30 ft) to 24 metres (80 ft) and began to drive two counter-mine tunnels towards the Germans. From the right-hand gallery the sounds of German digging grew steadily louder. On 19 November, 179th Tunnelling Company's commander, Captain Henry Hance, estimated that the Germans were 15 yards away and ordered the mine chamber to be loaded with 2,700 kilograms (6,000 lb) of explosive. This was completed by midnight from 20 to 21 November. At 1.30 am on 22 November, the Germans blew their charge, filling the remaining British tunnels with carbon monoxide. Both the right and left tunnels were collapsed, and it was later found that the German blow had detonated the British charge. The wrecked tunnels were gradually re-opened, but about thirty bodies still lie in the tunnels beneath La Boisselle. (Note: See also The real hero tunnellers of World War One who inspired BBC's Birdsong, www.mirror.co.uk, 21 January 2012 (online), access date 6 July 2015, where the date of the detonation is given with 22 October 1915.)

== Prelude ==
As part of the Allied preparations for the Battle of the Somme, the British intensified their underground operations in several selected front line sectors. This was particularly the case of the many Russian saps prepared in the various sectors from February 1916. The Royal Engineer mining units involved in preparing the battle were the 174th, 178th, 179th, 181st, 183rd, 185th and 252nd Tunnelling companies.

=== VII Corps ===
In the northernmost sector of the British front line, which was allocated to VII Corps in front of Gommecourt, no mines were prepared by the Royal Engineers for the offensive on 1 July. The British Army would use the neighbouring villages of Hebuterne and Foncquevillers as bases for the assault on Gommecourt, resulting in a severe defeat for the attacking force.

=== VIII Corps ===
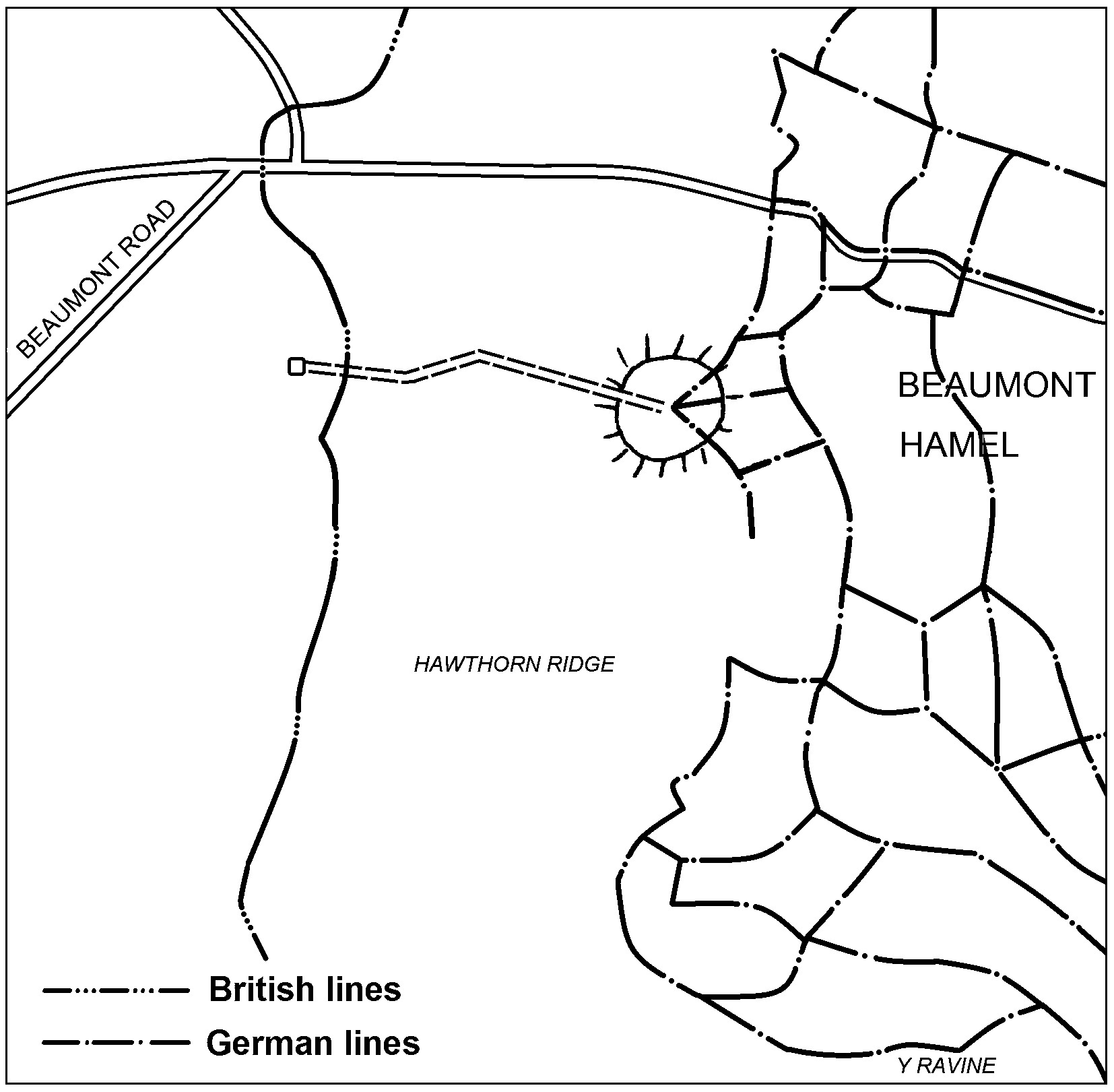
Plan of the H3 mine placed beneath the Hawthorn Ridge Redoubt

In the British front sector allocated to VIII Corps at Beaumont-Hamel, 252nd Tunnelling Company dug a large mine, code named H3, at Hawthorn Ridge Redoubt. and prepared twelve Russian saps facing Serre. Near the Hawthorn Ridge Redoubt, three tunnels were excavated under no man's land: The first was a 2-by-5-foot (0.61 m × 1.52 m) tunnel dug overnight to link to the now famous Sunken Lane (shown in the film The Battle of the Somme, released in August 1916) with the old British front line, and through which British units moved into position before the attack. In the early hours of 1 July, the 1st Battalion Lancashire Fusiliers would use this tunnel to move up into the "Sunken Lane", the starting position for their attack on Beaumont-Hamel. The two other tunnels were Russian saps, dug to within 30 yards (27 m) of the German front line, ready to be opened at 2:00 a.m. on 1 July, as emplacements for batteries of Stokes mortars. They were called First Avenue and Mary, named after the communications trenches leading into them.

The large H3 mine, located north of First Avenue and Mary, was placed by 252nd Tunnelling Company beneath Hawthorn Ridge Redoubt, the German stronghold on the ridge. Work on H3 began in spring 1916. The tunnellers under the command of Captain Rex Trower dug a gallery for about 1,000 yards (910 m) from the British lines about 57 feet (17 m) underground beneath the German position on the crest of the ridge. By the end of May, the mine gallery had been driven 900 feet (270 m), despite considerable trouble caused by the hard chalk and the number of flints in the face. To preserve silence, the face was softened by the application of water. In June the gallery was finished and charged with 40,000 pounds (18,000 kg) of ammonal. The VIII Corps commander, Lieutenant-General Aylmer Hunter-Weston, wanted the mine to be sprung four hours before zero hour, so that the crater could be captured and consolidated and the alarm on the German side would have died down. (Note: The plan was quashed at British Expeditionary Force General Headquarters (GHQ) after the Inspector of Mines pointed out that the British had never managed to reach a mine crater before the Germans and that the mine should be detonated at zero hour.) On 15 June, the Fourth Army headquarters ruled that all mines should be blown no earlier than eight minutes before zero but an unsatisfactory compromise was reached with Hunter-Weston to blow the Hawthorn Ridge Redoubt mine ten minutes before zero hour.

=== X Corps ===
In the British front sector allocated to X Corps at Thiepval, no mines were prepared by the Royal Engineers for the offensive on 1 July, although they dug a series of Russian saps into no man's land, ready to be opened at Zero Hour and allow the British infantry to attack the German positions from a comparatively short distance. Russian saps in front of Thiepval were the task of 179th Tunnelling Company, which also prepared such saps further south at Ovillers and La Boisselle. In the X Corps front section allocated to the 36th (Ulster) Division, ten Russian saps were run from the British lines into no-man's land north-east of Thiepval Wood. Each of the ten tunnels housed two mortars.

=== III Corps ===
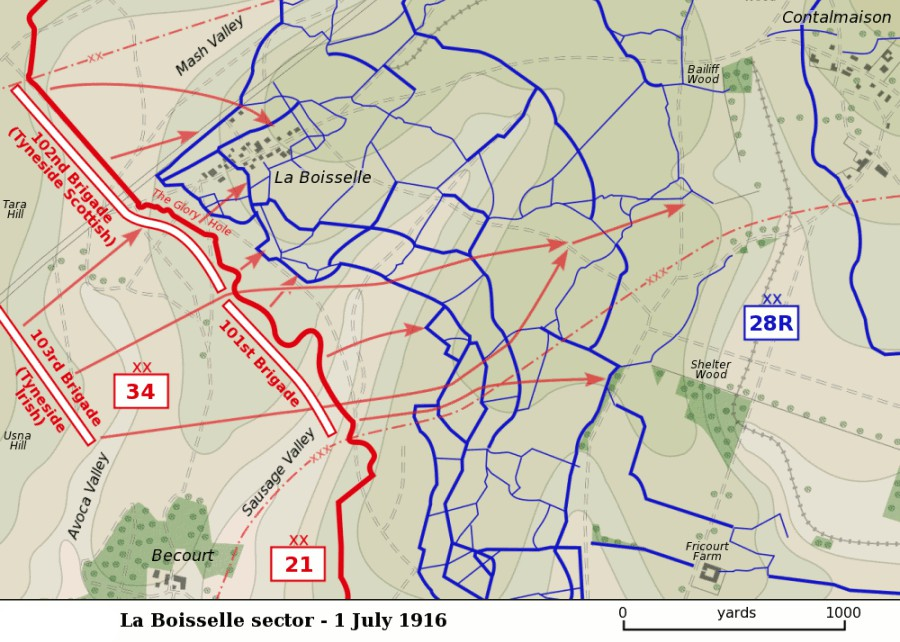
Map of La Boisselle with British movements on 1 July 1916

In the British front sector allocated to III Corps at La Boisselle, four mines were prepared: Two charges (known as No 2 straight and No 5 right) were planted at L'îlot at the end of galleries dug from Inch Street Trench by the 179th Tunnelling Company, intended to wreck German tunnels and create crater lips to block enfilade fire along no man's land. As the Germans in La Boisselle had fortified the cellars of ruined houses, and cratered ground made a direct infantry assault on the village impossible, two further mines, known as Y Sap and Lochnagar after the trenches from which they were dug, were laid on the north-east and the south-east of La Boisselle to assist the attack on either side of the German salient in the village – see map.

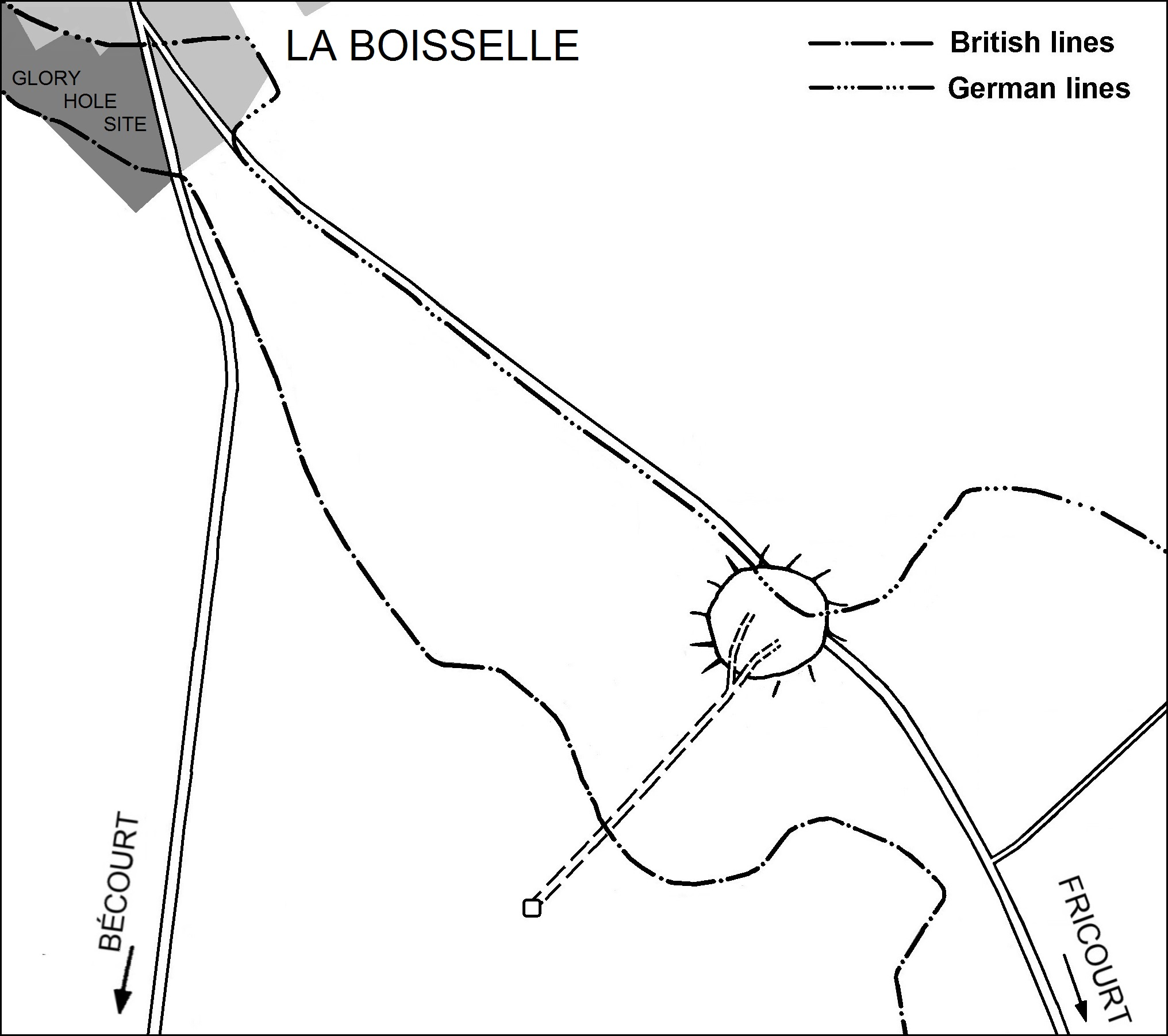
Map of the Lochnagar mine; for an aerial view of the site with marked front lines, see here

The 185th Tunnelling Company started work on the Lochnagar mine on 11 November 1915 and handed the tunnels over to 179th Tunnelling Company in March 1916. A month before the handover, 18 men of the 185th Tunnelling Company (2 officers, 16 sappers) were killed on 4 February when the Germans detonated a camouflet near the British three-level mine system, starting from Inch Street, La Boisselle, the deepest level being just above the water table at around 30 metres (100 ft). The Lochnagar mine consisted of two chambers with a shared access tunnel (see map). The shaft was sunk in the communication trench called Lochnagar Street. After the Black Watch had arrived at La Boissselle at the end of July 1915, many existing Allied fortifications, originally dug by the French, had been given Scotland-related names. The Lochnagar mine probably had the first deep incline shaft, which sloped 1:2–1:3 to a depth of about 29 metres (95 ft) – see map. It was begun 91 metres (300 ft) behind the British front line and 270 metres (900 ft) away from the German front line. Starting from the inclined shaft, about 15 metres (50 ft) below ground, a gallery was driven towards the German lines. For silence, the tunnellers used bayonets with spliced handles and worked barefoot on a floor covered with sandbags. Flints were carefully prised out of the chalk and laid on the floor; if the bayonet was manipulated two-handed, an assistant caught the dislodged material. Spoil was placed in sandbags and passed hand-by-hand, along a row of miners sitting on the floor and stored along the side of the tunnel, later to be used to tamp the charge. When about 41 metres (135 ft) from the Schwabenhöhe, the tunnel was forked into two branches and the end of each branch was enlarged to form a chamber for the explosives, the chambers being about 18 metres (60 ft) apart and 16 metres (52 ft) deep – see map. When finished, the access tunnel for the Lochnagar mine was 1.37 by 0.76 metres (4.5 ft × 2.5 ft) and had been excavated at a rate of about 46 centimetres (18 in) per day, until about 310 metres (1,030 ft) long, with the galleries beneath the Schwabenhöhe. The mine was loaded with 27,000 kilograms (60,000 lb) of ammonal, divided in two charges of 16,000 kilograms (36,000 lb) and 11,000 kilograms (24,000 lb). As the chambers were not big enough to hold all the explosive, the tunnels that branched to form the 'Y' were also filled with ammonal. The longer branch was 18 metres (60 ft) long, the shorter was 12 metres (40 ft) long. The tunnels did not quite reach the German front line but the blast would dislodge enough material to form a 4.6 metres (15 ft) high rim and bury nearby trenches.

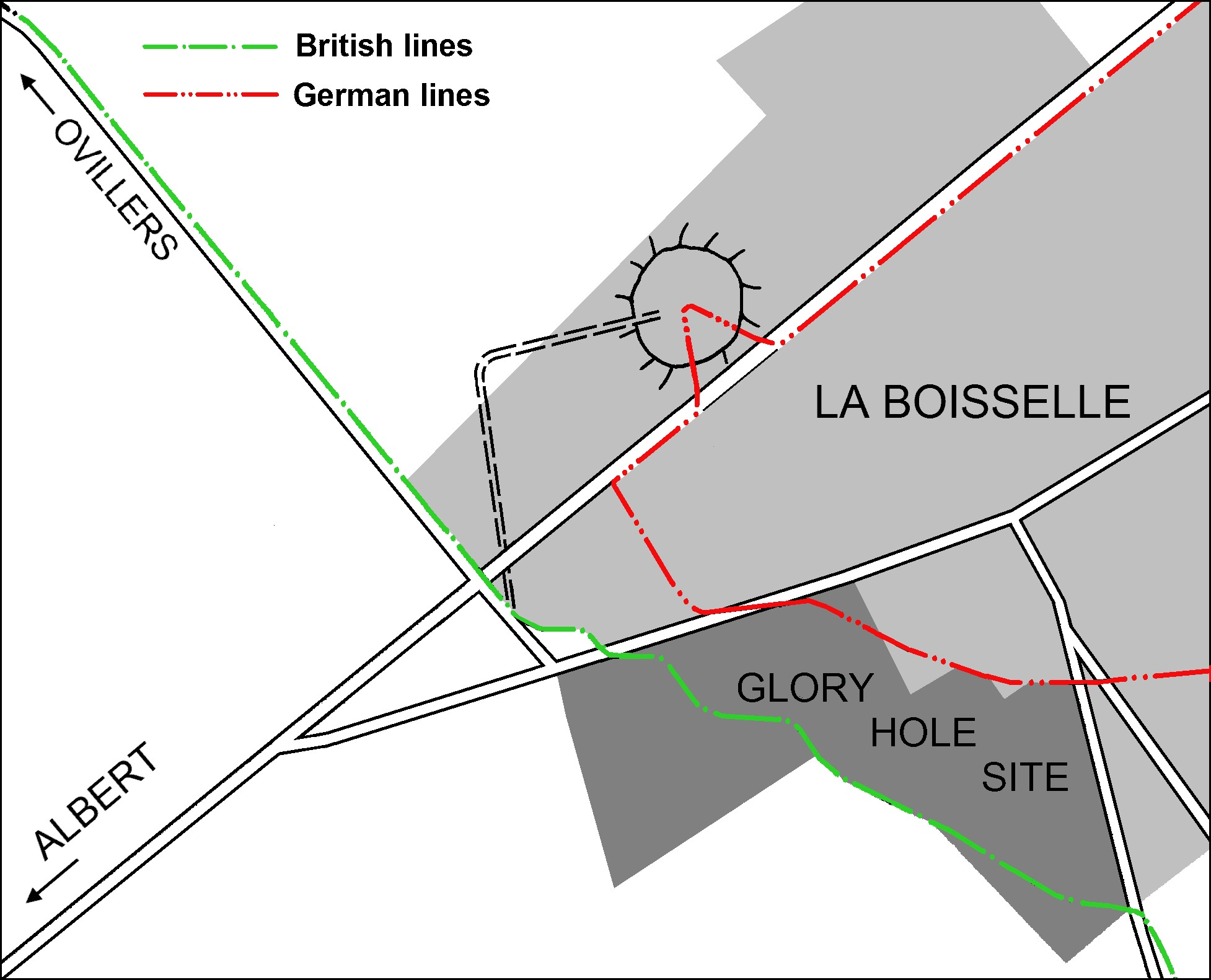
Plan of the Y Sap mine. The Glory Hole site was known as Granathof to the Germans and as L'îlot de La Boisselle to the French.

The tunnel for the Y Sap mine underneath the German trenches overlooking Mash Valley just north of La Boisselle started in the British front line near where it crossed the D 929 Albert–Bapaume road, but because of German underground defences it could not be dug in a straight line. About 460 metres (500 yd) were dug into no man's land, before it turned right for about another 460 metres (500 yd). About 18,000 kilograms (40,000 lb) of ammonal was placed in the chamber beneath the Y Sap mine. The Lochnagar and the Y Sap mines were "overcharged" to ensure that large rims were formed from the disturbed ground. Communication tunnels were also dug for use immediately after the first attack but were little used in the end. The mines were laid without interference by German miners but as the explosives were placed, German miners could be heard below Lochnagar and above the Y Sap mine.

=== XV Corps ===
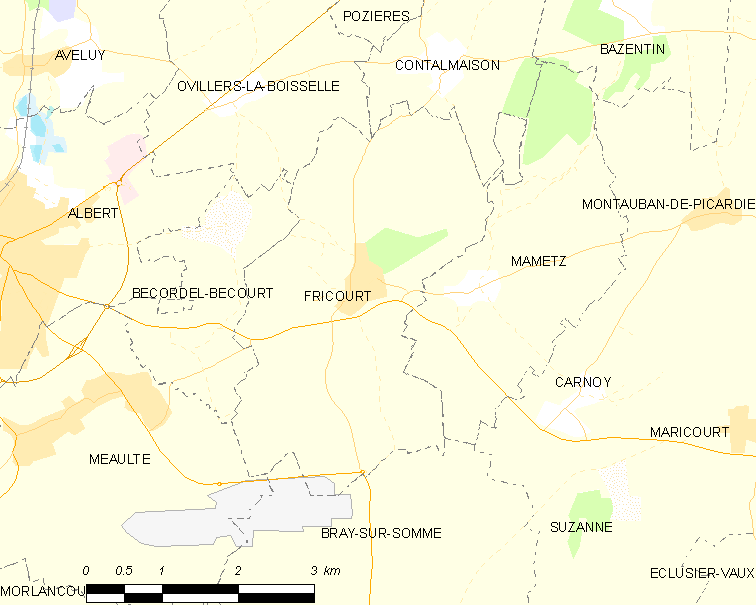
Map of Fricourt, Mametz and vicinity

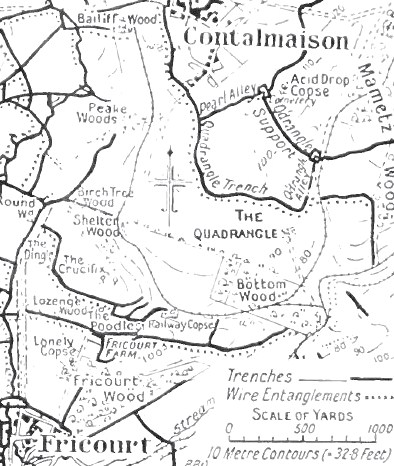
Map of the Fricourt–Contalmaison area,1916

In the British front sector allocated to XV Corps at Fricourt, the German positions were extremely strong and the village itself was like a fortress. For this reason, no frontal assault was planned in this area for 1 July as the British infantry would have had to advance across large crater fields. Instead, the tunnellers would place a group of three mines known as Triple Tambour beneath the German Kniewerk stronghold. Local but fierce underground fighting at Fricourt had taken place in the winter of 1914 and spring of 1915, during which the Tambour had been extensively mined. The French had carried out mining operations in the Tambour area when they held this sector of the line and British tunnellers began working there on mines in August 1915. The whole area was a veritable warren of shafts and tunnels which had produced a patchwork of small craters, German trench maps indicating five craters before 1 July 1916. The three Tambour mines were laid by 178th Tunnelling Company. The craters resulting from the explosion of the charges were intended to protect the infantry advance of the 21st Division from German enfilade fire from the village of Fricourt. It was thought the mines could raise a protective "lip" of earth that would obscure the view from the village and the German machine-gun positions but the effort failed. The three Tambour mines were loaded with relatively small charges of 4,100 kilograms (9,000 lb), 6,800 kilograms (15,000 lb) and 11,000 kilograms (25,000 lb) which were detonated at 7:28 a.m., just before the British infantry advanced; one failed to explode due to damp and is reportedly still buried off Fricourt. 178th Tunnelling Company's war diary entry reads "1/7/16 "Z"Day. Mines in G3E, G19A exploded at 7:28 a.m. 2 minutes before Zero. G15b not successful". According to an account of the British attack on Fricourt "...A British attack west of the Tambour was countered by a defensive mine, which inflicted many casualties on the 21st Division as it attacked, along with machine-gun fire from the hill above Fricourt." (Note: James Edmonds, the British official historian, wrote that there was no British account of a mine or an explosion killing 80 British soldiers.) The site of the mines appears as a small area of cratered ground in the field beyond the Commonwealth War Graves Commission Fricourt New Military Cemetery. The land the craters are on is private property. The two craters on the eastern edge of the craterfield are probably the G3 and G19 mines.

In the front sector allocated to XV Corps between Fricourt and Mametz, the Mametz West group of four 230-kilogram (500 lb) mines was planted along the German trench lines running east from the heights of Bois Français, located south of Hidden Wood and 1.03 kilometres (0.64 mi) south-east of Fricourt. The unit in charge was the 174th Tunnelling Company. Underground fighting at Bois Français had already taken place in the winter of 1914 and spring of 1915. Before the summer of 1916, no-man's land south of Bois Français had already witnessed the blowing of at least eight mines, and the area of Kiel and Danube trenches, located some 0.46 kilometres (500 yd) to the east of Bois Français, had also seen extensive underground operations. In October 1915, John Norton-Griffiths had even advocated the use of poison gas to deal with the German resistance in the Bois Français sector, but the proposal was not followed up. As at Fricourt, no frontal assault was planned in this area for 1 July as the British infantry would have had to advance across large crater fields. Instead, the Royal Engineers placed the Mametz West mine group there – three charges at Kiel Trench and one at Danube Trench. The first purpose of these mines was to protect the left of the 7th Division's attack south of Mametz, while the second was to protect the 20th Battalion, Manchester Regiment during their attack on the German lines.

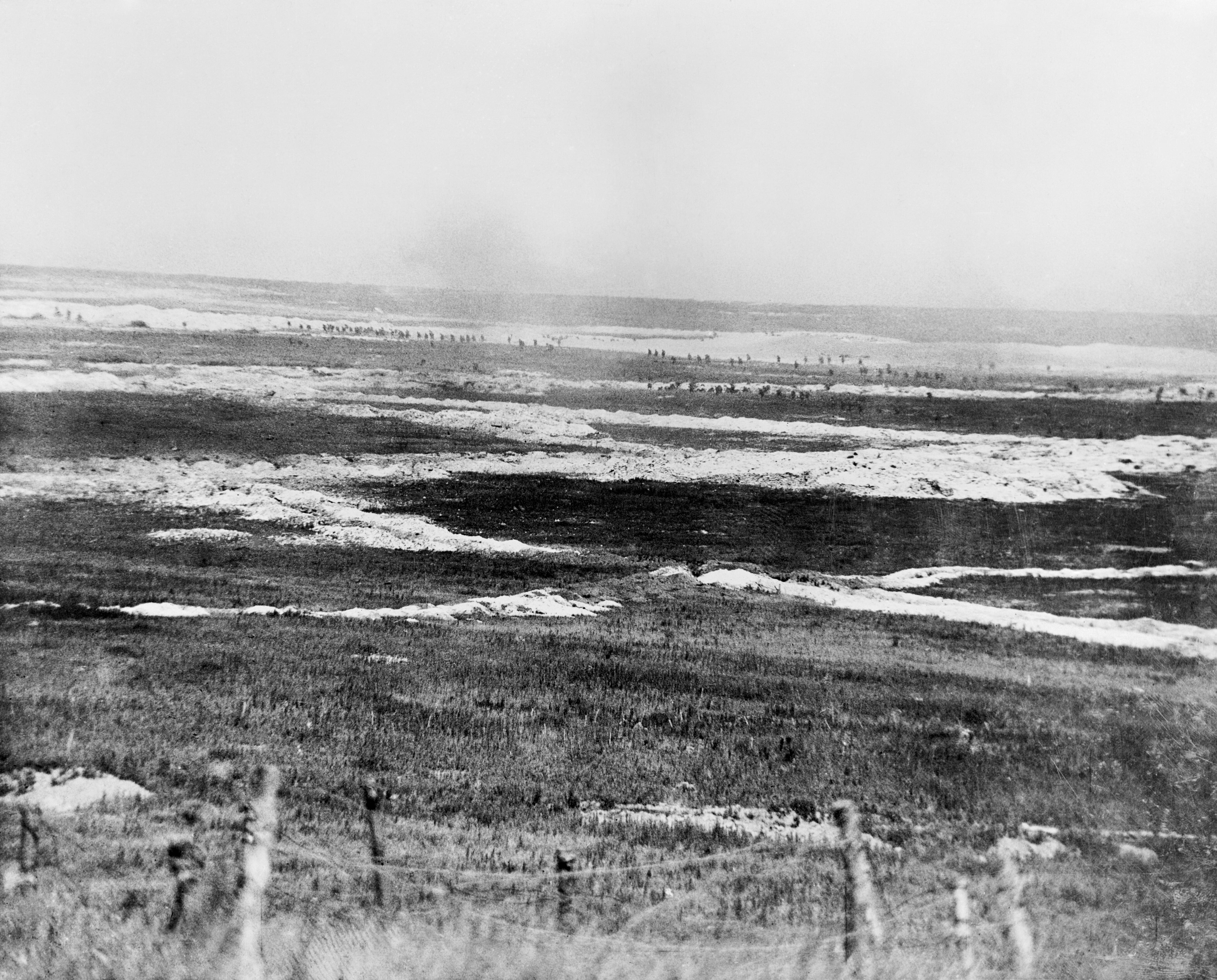
2nd Battalion, Gordon Highlanders crossing no man's land near Mametz

The Mametz East group consisted of four mines in the Mametz sector, all laid by 183rd Tunnelling Company. Bulgar Point, a heavily wired German strong work facing the 1st Battalion South Staffordshire Regiment's attack south-east of Mametz, was mined with 910 kilograms (2,000 lb) of explosives; a sap further west was loaded with a 91-kilogram (200 lb) charge in support of the Gordon Highlanders' attack; and two more 230-kilogram (500 lb) mines were laid beneath Austrian Trench, on the extreme right of the 7th Division's sphere of action, on the boundary with the front sector allocated to XIII Corps. In addition to placing the four mines, 183rd Tunnelling Company from February 1916 onwards prepared dozens of Russian saps for the attack, which ran from the British front line to the very edge of the German positions. Small charges could be blown from the end of these tunnels and they could then be used to reinforce the captured positions. Four saps were further equipped with Livens Large Gallery Flame Projectors, ready to cover the German front line with liquid fire. In order to protect them from enemy fire, the flame throwers were hauled into the saps just hours before the battle. Two tunnels which housed such weapons – located at Kiel Trench south-west of Mametz and between Carnoy and Kasino Point – were damaged by German shellfire before the attack. The two remaining were put to use from saps immediately left of the mine crater field at Carnoy. In view of the work required, 183rd Tunnelling Company took a calculated risk by stopping its defensive mining activities between Carnoy and Fricourt, which had so far guaranteed the underground safety of the British trenches in that area. By 1 July, the British tunnel network excavated in this sector extended 91 metres (300 ft) under no man's land.

=== XIII Corps ===
Early underground fighting at Carnoy had taken place in the winter of 1914 and spring of 1915. Mine warfare directly in front of Carnoy, near the Carnoy–Montauban road, was conducted by both sides from May 1916. In this southernmost sector of the British front line, which was allocated to XIII Corps, three mines were laid by 183rd Tunnelling Company. Two were to be fired north of Carnoy at 07.27 hours: a 2,300-kilogram (5,000 lb) charge under a German salient at Kasino Point and a 230-kilogram (500 lb) charge on the extreme left flank, intended to collapse German dug outs and destroy machine-gun nests. The third mine in the Carnoy group also held a 230-kilogram (500 lb) charge. As in the Mametz East sector, 183rd Tunnelling Company had to stop its defensive mining activities off Carnoy so the work underground could be finished in time. All deep mining was halted, except at Kasino Point where an inclined gallery was built. As the chalk grew harder, the method of softening involved drilling holes with a carpenter's auger, into which the miners poured vinegar. When it was fired, the mine produced a crater with lips 30 metres (97 ft) in diameter and 9.1 metres (30 ft) deep. The miners reported after the attack that the Kasino Point mine had buried three German dugouts and four sniper's posts, and probably a machine-gun emplacement as well. During tunnelling at Kasino Point, the British broke into a German dugout but were able to cover it up before the breach was noticed. J. E. Edmonds wrote in 1932 that this incident occurred during the digging of Russian saps rather than the Kasino Point mine. Middlebrook wrote in 1971 that the Kasino Point Salient was between Mametz, Carnoy and Montauban and the mine planted there was one of seven large mines that were due to be detonated on 1 July.

== Battle: 1 July 1916 ==
The mines were detonated by the Royal Engineers in the morning of Saturday 1 July, the opening day of the Battle of Albert (1–13 July), the name given by the British to the first two weeks of the Battle of the Somme. The British Third and Fourth armies, together with nine corps of the French Sixth Army, would attack the German 2nd Army in an area stretching from Foucaucourt south of the River Somme northwards beyond the River Ancre, to Serre and Gommecourt, 3.2 kilometres (2 mi) beyond. The objective of the attack was to capture the German first and second positions from Serre south to the D 929 Albert–Bapaume road and the first position from the road south to Foucaucourt.

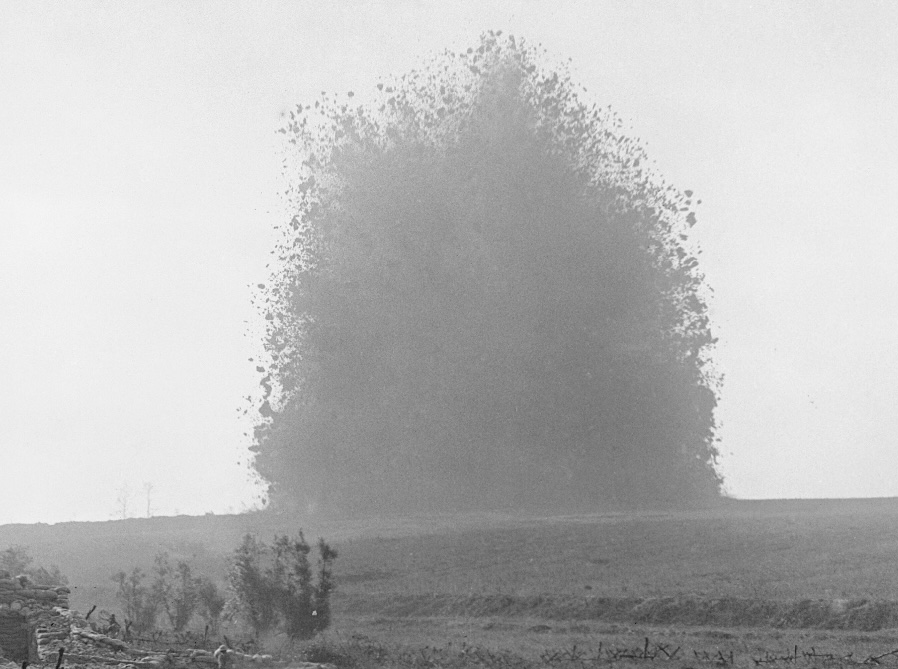
The explosion of the mine under Hawthorn Ridge Redoubt, 1 July 1916 (Photo 1 by Ernest Brooks)

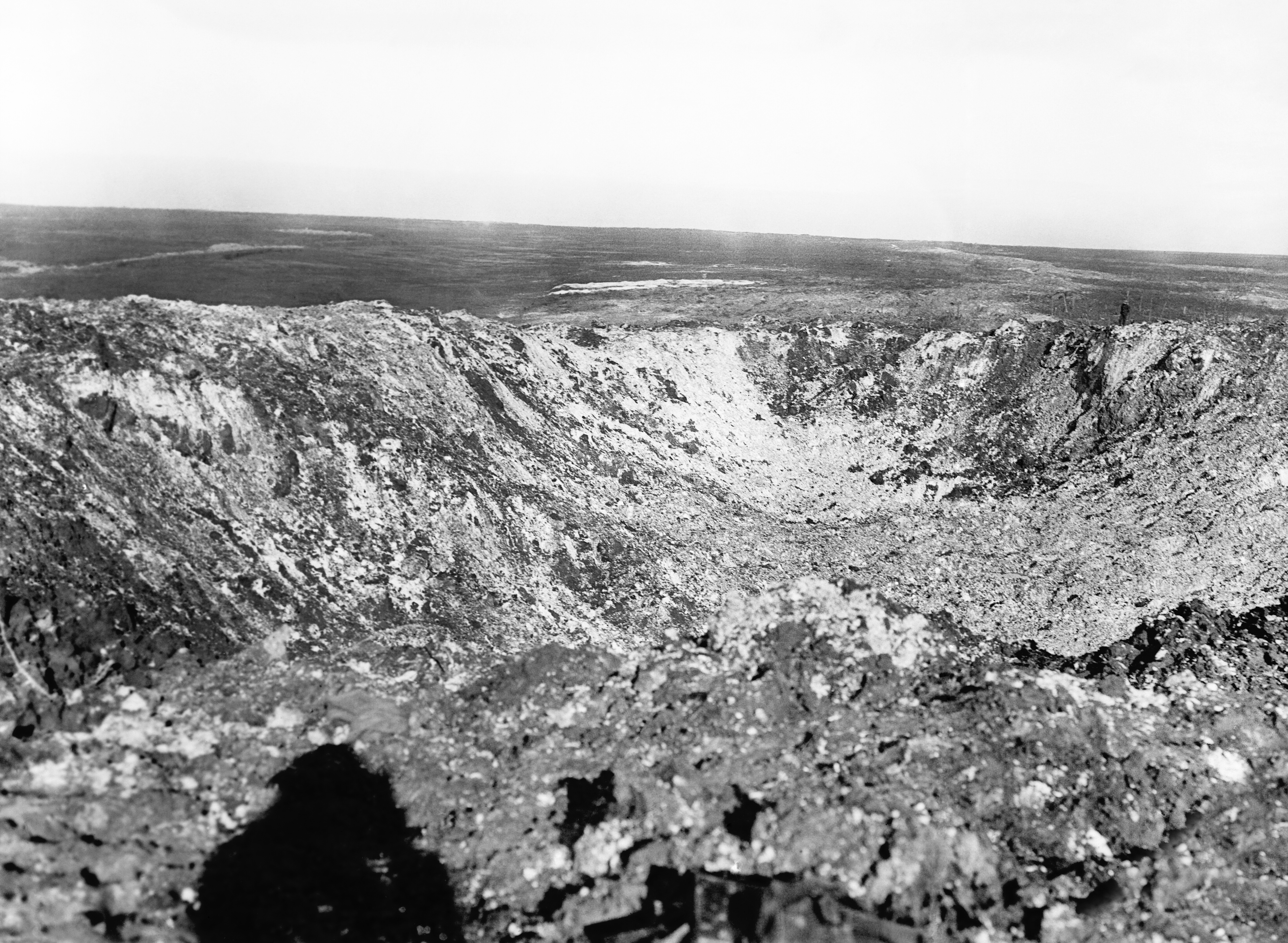
The crater left by the mine fired beneath Hawthorn Ridge Redoubt (IWM Q 1527, November 1916); note shadow of photographer, left foreground

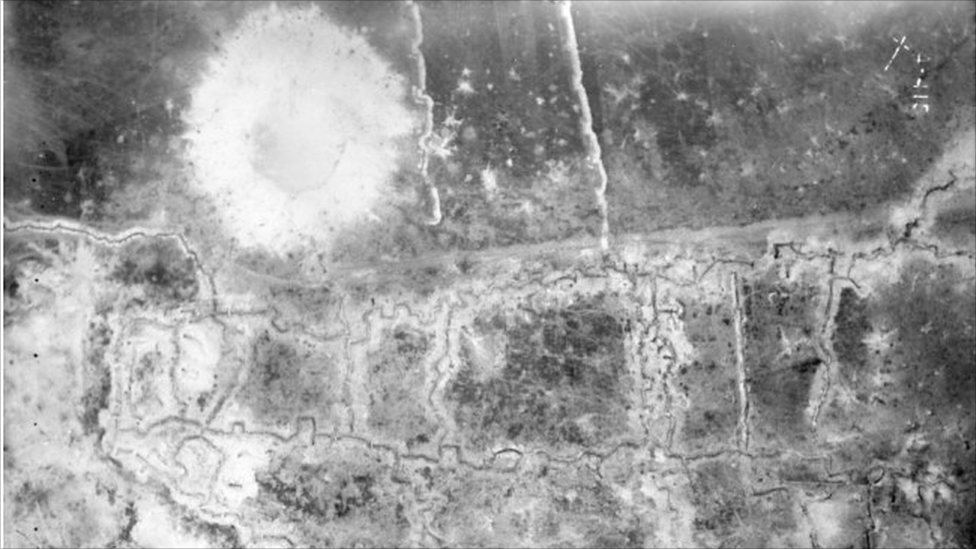
British aerial photograph showing the Lochnagar Crater and trenches

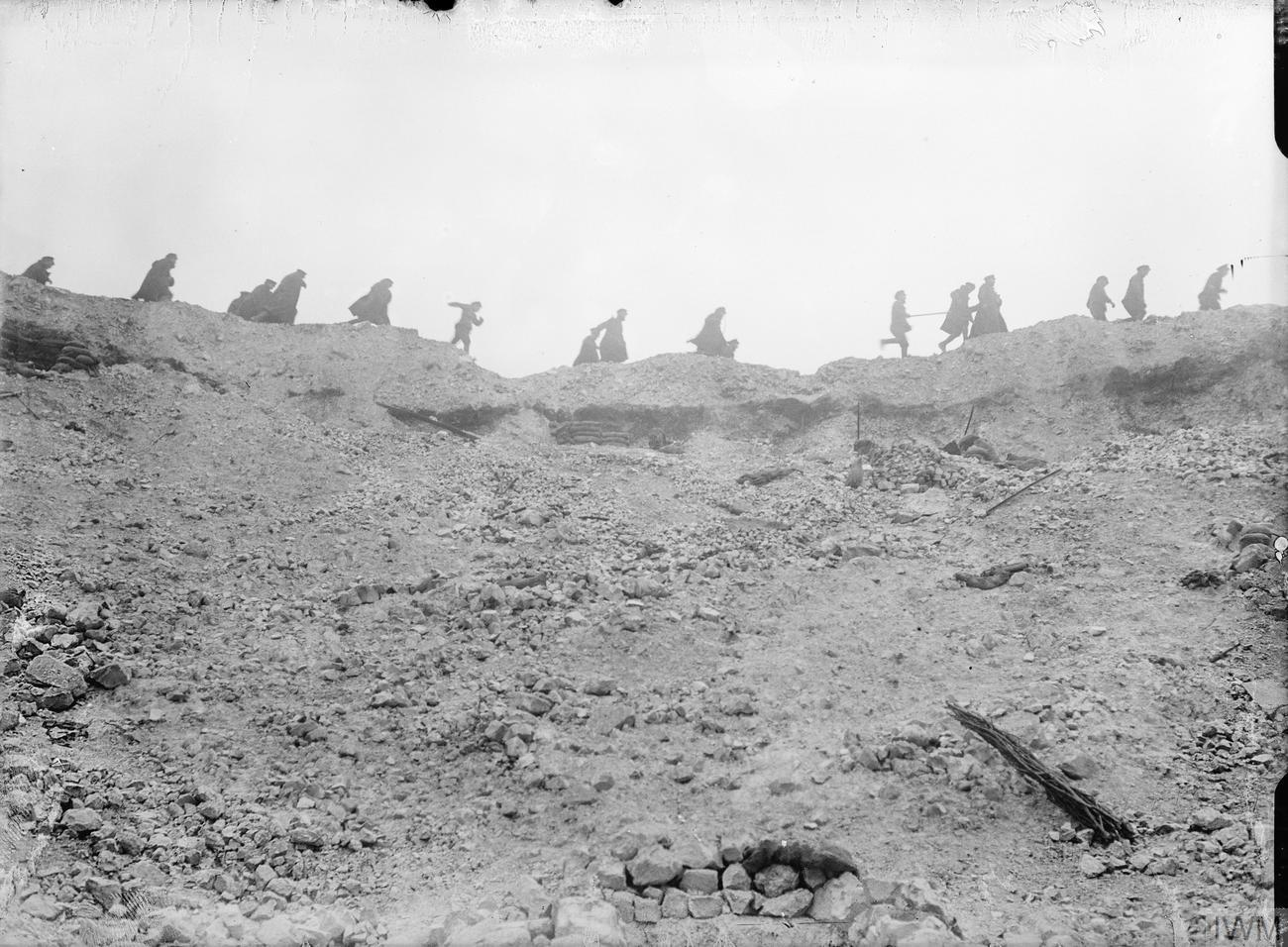
Troops passing the Lochnagar Crater, October 1916

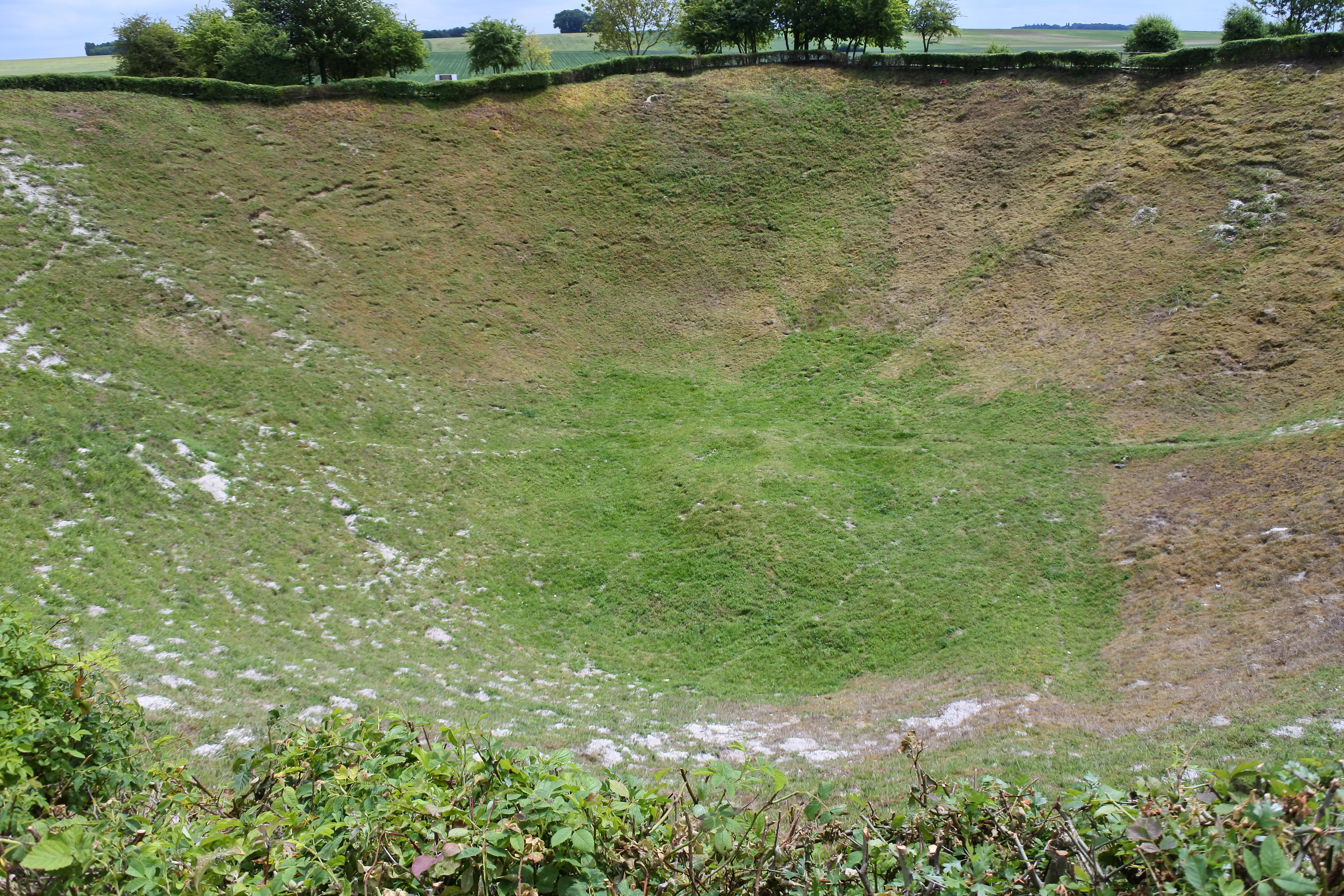
Lochnagar crater in 2017.

The Hawthorn Ridge mine was detonated at 7:20 a.m.. The explosion was filmed by British cinematographer Geoffrey Malins who had his camera set up about 0.80-kilometre (0.5 mi) away. A frame from the film became one of the iconic photographs of the first day of the battle. As soon as the mine blew, the British heavy artillery bombardment on the German front line lifted and Stokes mortars began a hurricane bombardment on the front trench. British troops rushed the crater where they were engaged by machine-gun and rifle fire from the far lip and the flanks. Three sections of German infantry (about thirty men) of the 9th Company were killed in the mine explosion and 1 1/2 platoons were trapped in their Unterstände (underground shelters), from which only two sections escaped. The rest of the company in a Stollen (deep-mined dugout) survived but the entrances were blocked and the troops inside were not rescued until after the British attack. Despite the shock and disorientation caused by the detonation of the mine, German troops immediately occupied the rear lip of the crater. The Germans also immediately brought down a heavy artillery barrage onto the British trenches. The 2nd Battalion, Royal Fusiliers (86th Brigade, 29th Division), crossing no man's land to occupy the crater, came under heavy German rifle and machine-gun fire from either flank and the rear lip. A few British soldiers managed to reach the closest lip of the crater and held on until noon when they were forced out by a German counter-attack. The failure to take the Hawthorn Ridge Redoubt had a serious effect on the VIII Corps operations north of the River Ancre.

Eight minutes after the explosion of the Hawthorn Ridge mine, the Lochnagar mine was detonated at 7:28 a.m., along with the other mines prepared for the First day of the Somme. The explosion of the Lochnagar mine was initiated by Captain James Young of the 179th Tunnelling Company, who pressed the switches and observed that the firing had been successful. The two charges of the Lochnagar mine obliterated 91–122 metres (300–400 ft) of German fortifications, including nine dugouts and the men inside them. Earth was thrown 1,200 metres (4,000 ft) into the air. Most of the 5th Company of Reserve Infantry Regiment 110 and the trenches nearby were destroyed. The Lochnagar mine lay on the sector assaulted by the Grimsby Chums, a Pals battalion (10th Battalion, The Lincolnshire Regiment). When the main attack began at 7:30 a.m., the Grimsby Chums occupied the crater and began to fortify the eastern lip, which dominated the vicinity and the advance continued to the Grüne Stellung (second position), where it was stopped by the German 4th Company, which then counter-attacked and forced the British back to the crater.

At Bulgar Point, located east of Mametz in the front sector allocated to XV Corps, the German position was completely destroyed by the detonation of the No 12 mine with 910 kilograms (2,000 lb) of ammonal. Four other British mines in the already cratered area between Mametz and Fricourt also exploded successfully.

Though the mines on the British front were to be blown at 7:28 a.m. (the only exception being that at Hawthorn Ridge), the Kasino Point mine was late, because the officer in charge hesitated when he saw that British troops had left their trenches and begun to advance across no man's land. The German machine-gunners at the point opened fire and inflicted many casualties, so the officer detonated the mine which, instead of exploding upwards, sent debris outwards over wide area, causing casualties among at least four British battalions, as well as obliterating several German machine-gun nests. A witness wrote later

I looked left to see if my men were keeping a straight line. I saw a sight I shall never forget. A giant fountain, rising from our line of men, about 100 yards from me. Still on the move I stared at this, not realizing what it was. It rose, a great column nearly as high as Nelson's Column, then slowly toppled over. Before I could think, I saw huge slabs of earth and chalk thudding down, some with flames attached, onto the troops as they advanced.

— L/Cpl E. J. Fisher, 10th Essex

but the late detonation surprised and demoralised the Germans, whose fire diminished and the British swept over the German front trenches, making it the most successful mine detonation of 1 July. Looking back at building the Lochnagar mine, Captain Stanley Bullock of 179th Tunnelling Company described the conditions of the work,

At one place in particular our men swore they thought he [the German enemy] was coming through, so we stopped driving forward and commenced to chamber in double shifts. We did not expect to complete it before he blew, but we did. A chamber 12′ × 6′ × 6′ in 24 hours. The Germans worked for a shift more than we did and then stopped. They knew we had chambered and were afraid we should blow and no more work was done there. I used to hate going to listen in that chamber more than any other place in the mine. Half an hour, sometimes once sometimes three times a day, in deadly silence with the geophone to your ears, wondering whether the sound you heard was the Boche working silently or your own heart beating. God knows how we kept our nerves and judgement. After the Somme attack when we surveyed the German mines and connected up to our own system, with the theodolite we found that we were 5 feet apart, and that he had only started his chamber and then stopped.

— Captain Stanley Bullock

While the British mines on the first day of the Somme were an undoubted success for the tunnellers who had built and maintained them, their value for the advancing infantry was questioned:

The nineteen mine craters, in which so many soldiers were trapped and killed by the German machine-gunners, became a hated feature of the battlefield.

— Martin Gilbert, 2007

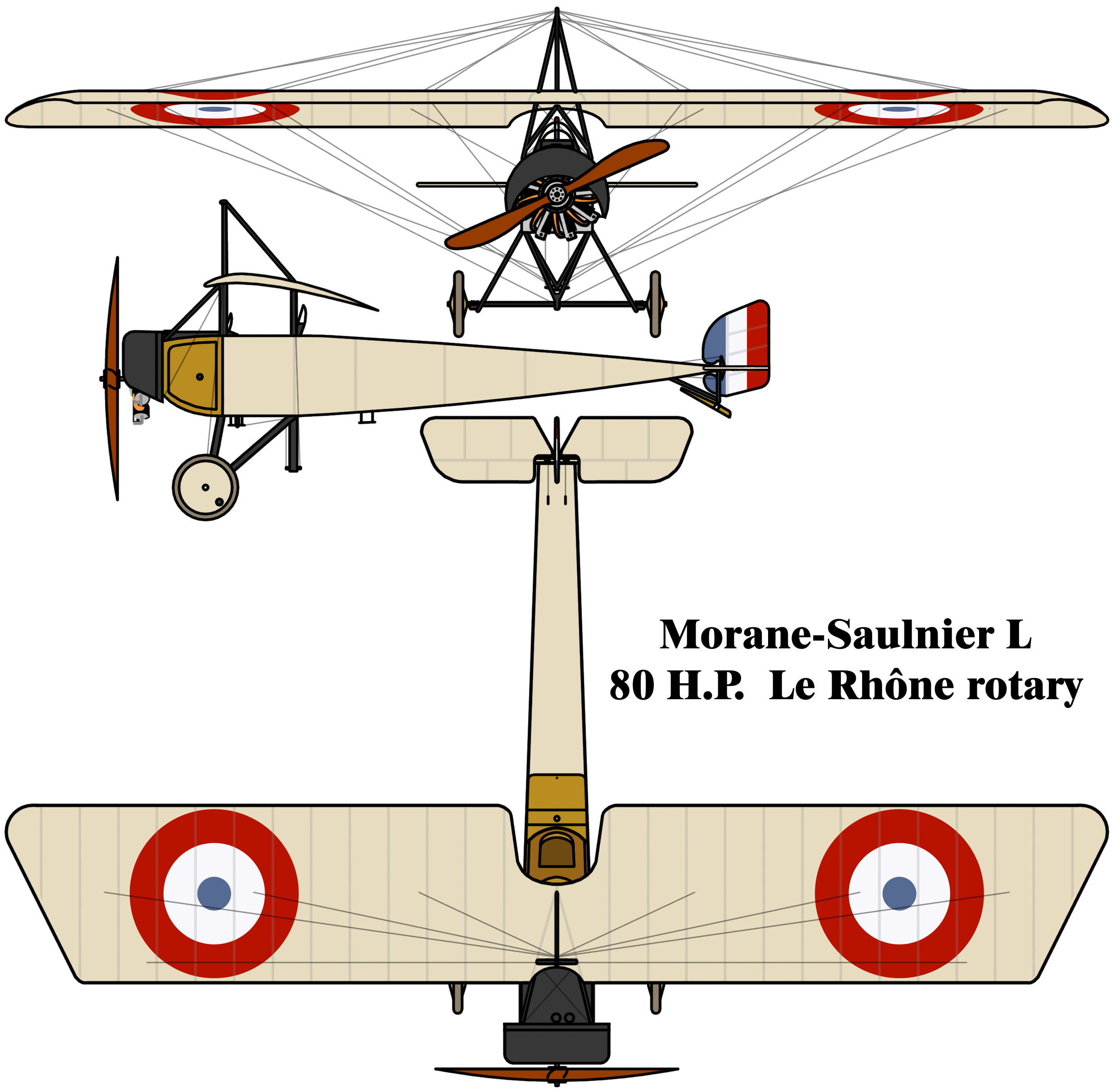
Morane Parasol, as flown by Cecil Lewis on 1 July 1916

The blowing of the Lochnagar and Y Sap mines at 7:28 a.m. was witnessed by pilots who were flying over the battlefield to report back on British troop movements. It had been arranged that continuous overlapping patrols would fly throughout the day. 2nd Lieutenant Cecil Lewis' patrol of 3 Squadron was warned against flying too close to La Boisselle, where two mines were due to go up, but would be able to watch from a safe distance. Flying up and down the line in a Morane Parasol, he watched from above Thiepval, almost two miles from La Boisselle, and later described the early morning scene in his book Sagittarius Rising (1936),

We were over Thiepval and turned south to watch the mines. As we sailed down above all, came the final moment. Zero! At Boisselle the earth heaved and flashed, a tremendous and magnificent column rose up into the sky. There was an ear-splitting roar, drowning all the guns, flinging the machine sideways in the repercussing air. The earthly column rose, higher and higher to almost four thousand feet. There it hung, or seemed to hang, for a moment in the air, like a silhouette of some great cypress tree, then fell away in a widening cone of dust and debris. A moment later came the second mine. Again the roar, the upflung machine, the strange gaunt silhouette invading the sky. Then the dust cleared and we saw the two white eyes of the craters. The barrage had lifted to the second-line trenches, the infantry were over the top, the attack had begun.

— Cecil Lewis, whose aircraft was hit by lumps of mud thrown up by the explosion.

== Aftermath ==
In 1932, Brigadier Sir James Edmonds wrote regarding the mines that the "lack of manpower prevented more [from] being undertaken". Sir Martin Gilbert wrote in 2007 that although fewer mines than planned had been completed, "it was a formidable enterprise".

Following the attack on 1 July, there were a few other mines blown during the Battle of the Somme. In the south of the battlefield, the front line moved on from the mine systems. In other areas, where the British had not gained much ground, schemes for new Russian saps were put in place by 3 July and the miners' sapping efforts intensified with the aim of quadrupling the number of Russian saps for future attacks.

At High Wood, the 178th Tunnelling Company drove a mine at just 7.6 metres (25 ft) depth, 98 metres (320 ft) long, which they charged with 1,400 kilograms (3,000 lb) of ammonal. It was blown thirty seconds before Zero Hour on 3 September 1916. After advancing British infantry had failed to capture the crater permanently, 178th Tunnelling Company reopened the gallery, charged it with another 1,400 kilograms (3,000 lb) of ammonal and blew the mine again on 9 September. This time the crater was successfully held.

In the north of the battlefield, after the detonation of the H3 mine at Hawthorn Ridge Redoubt on 1 July, 252nd Tunnelling Company on 4 July began work on a second mine, loaded with 14,000 kilograms (30,000 lb) of ammonal, which was placed beneath the crater of the first explosion. This new mine was fired to signal Zero Hour at the start of the Battle of the Ancre on 13 November, when a successful British attack took the village of Beaumont-Hamel. The crater visible on Hawthorn Ridge is therefore actually a double crater, lined today with trees and thick undergrowth, but not filled with water. The site affords good views of the location of the German positions.

During the Allied preparations for the Battle of Vimy Ridge (9 – 12 April 1917) the mines fired on the first day of the Somme became the object of strategic considerations. In order to assess the consequences of infantry having to advance across cratered ground after a mining attack, officers from the Canadian Corps visited La Boisselle and Fricourt where the mines had been blown. Their reports and the experience of the Canadians at St Eloi in April 1916 – where mines had so altered and damaged the landscape as to render occupation of the mine craters by the infantry all but impossible –, led to the decision to remove offensive mining from the central sector allocated to the Canadian Corps at Vimy Ridge.

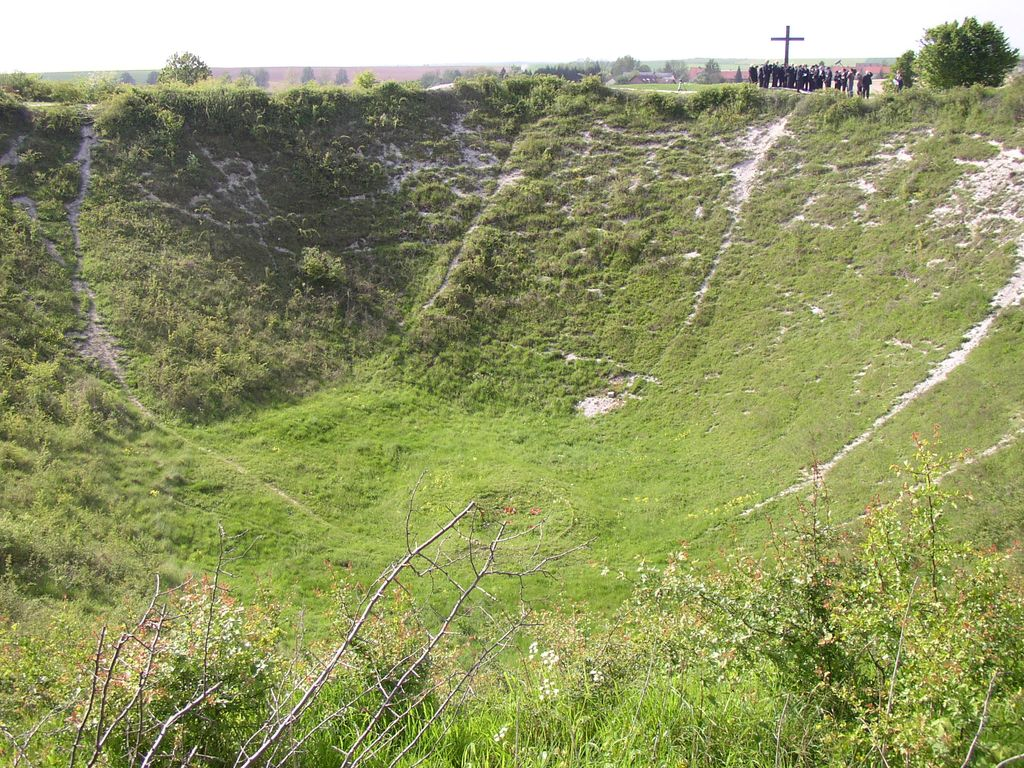
The Lochnagar Crater in 2005

William Orpen, an official war artist, saw the Lochnagar mine crater in 1916 while touring the Somme battlefield, collecting subjects for paintings and described a wilderness of chalk dotted with shrapnel. John Masefield also toured the Somme, while preparing The Old Front Line (1917), in which he also described the area around the Lochnagar Crater as dazzlingly white and painful to look at.

The land around the Lochnagar Crater was eventually purchased by an Englishman, Richard Dunning, to ensure its preservation after he read The Old Front Line and was inspired to buy a section of the former front line. The site attracts about 200,000 visitors a year and there is an annual memorial service on 1 July, to commemorate the detonation of the mine and the British, French and German war dead.

== List of the mines ==
British mines, Battle of the Somme, July 1916

| No. | Location | Name | Explosive charge | Tunnel length | Depth | Fate | Notes |
|---|---|---|---|---|---|---|---|
| 1 | Beaumont-Hamel | H3 | 18,400 kilograms (40,600 lb) | 910 metres (1,000 yd) | 17 metres (57 ft) | fired on 1 July 1916 | Located beneath the German "Hawthorn Ridge Redoubt" position directly in front of the British "White City" trenches, in the front sector allocated to VIII Corps. The area was named after the banks of local white chalk into which the British trenches were cut. Position: 50°05′0.2″N 2°39′0.54″E |
| 2 | La Boisselle | Y Sap | 18,000 kilograms (40,000 lb) | 940 metres (1,030 yd) | | fired on 1 July 1916 | Placed to the north of La Boisselle (see map) and located in the front sector allocated to III Corps (see Capture of La Boisselle). The crater has since been filled in and is no longer visible. Position: 50°01′14.5″N 2°41′24.1″E |
| 3 | La Boisselle | No 2 straight | 3,600 kilograms (8,000 lb) | | | fired on 1 July 1916 | One of the two charges at La Boisselle known as the Glory Hole mines, it was placed from galleries dug from Inch Street Trench. They were intended to wreck German tunnels and were located in the front sector allocated to III Corps (see Capture of La Boisselle). Position: 50°01′06.7″N 2°41′26.2″E |
| 4 | La Boisselle | No 5 right | 3,600 kilograms (8,000 lb) | | | fired on 1 July 1916 | One of the two charges at La Boisselle known as the Glory Hole mines, it was placed from galleries dug from Inch Street Trench. They were intended to wreck German tunnels and were located in the front sector allocated to III Corps (see Capture of La Boisselle). Position: 50°01′06.7″N 2°41′26.2″E |
| 5 | La Boisselle | Lochnagar | 27,000 kilograms (60,000 lb) | 310 metres (1,030 ft) | 16 metres (52 ft) | fired on 1 July 1916 | The mine consisted of two chambers with a shared gallery (see plan). It was placed beneath the Schwabenhöhe to the south of La Boisselle (see map). Building began 11 November 1915. It was located in the front sector allocated to III Corps (see Capture of La Boisselle). Position: 50°00′56″N 2°41′50″E |
| 6 | Fricourt | G3 | 4,100 kilograms (9,000 lb) | | | fired on 1 July 1916 | Part of the mine group known as Triple Tambour placed beneath the Kniewerk just west of Fricourt (see map) in the front sector allocated to XV Corps (see Capture of Fricourt). The two craters on the eastern edge of the surviving craterfield at the Tambour site are probably G3 and G19. Position: 50°00′01.4″N 2°42′34.5″E |
| 7 | Fricourt | G19 | 6,800 kilograms (15,000 lb) | | | fired on 1 July 1916 | Part of the mine group known as Triple Tambour placed beneath the Kniewerk just west of Fricourt (see map) in the front sector allocated to XV Corps (see Capture of Fricourt). The two craters on the eastern edge of the surviving craterfield at the Tambour site are probably G3 and G19. Position: 50°00′01.4″N 2°42′34.5″E |
| 8 | Fricourt | G15 | 11,000 kilograms (25,000 lb) | | | fired on 1 July 1916 | Part of the mine group known as Triple Tambour placed beneath the Kniewerk just west of Fricourt (see map) in the front sector allocated to XV Corps (see Capture of Fricourt). This mine failed to explode, apparently because of damp; it may still be in place today. Position: 50°00′01.4″N 2°42′34.5″E |
| 9 | Mametz West | C2 | 230 kilograms (500 lb) | | | fired on 1 July 1916 | Located in the front sector allocated to XV Corps (see Capture of Mametz). Position: 49°59′17.9″N 2°43′41.8″E |
| 10 | Mametz West | No 15 | 230 kilograms (500 lb) | | | fired on 1 July 1916 | Located in the front sector allocated to XV Corps (see Capture of Mametz). |
| 11 | Mametz West | No 15.1 | 230 kilograms (500 lb) | | | fired on 1 July 1916 | Located in the front sector allocated to XV Corps (see Capture of Mametz). |
| 12 | Mametz West | No 14.1 | 230 kilograms (500 lb) | | | fired on 1 July 1916 | Located in the front sector allocated to XV Corps (see Capture of Mametz). |
| 13 | Mametz East | No 13 | 91 kilograms (200 lb) | | | fired on 1 July 1916 | Located in the front sector allocated to XV Corps (see Capture of Mametz). Position: 49°59′26.86″N 2°44′19.32″E |
| 14 | Mametz East | No 12 | 910 kilograms (2,000 lb) | | | fired on 1 July 1916 | Also known as the Bulgar Point mine and located in the front sector allocated to XV Corps (see Capture of Mametz). Position: 49°59′29.8″N 2°44′27.8″E |
| 15 | Mametz East | No 2.3 | 230 kilograms (500 lb) | | | fired on 1 July 1916 | Located in the front sector allocated to XV Corps (see Capture of Mametz). Position: 49°59′31.78″N 2°44′50.66″E |
| 16 | Mametz East | No 1.3 | 230 kilograms (500 lb) | | | fired on 1 July 1916 | Located in the front sector allocated to XV Corps (see Capture of Mametz). Position: 49°59′32.43″N 2°44′53.1″E |
| 17 | Carnoy | No 11 | 2,300 kilograms (5,000 lb) | | | fired on 1 July 1916 | Also known as the Kasino Point mine; located in the front sector allocated to XIII Corps (see Capture of Montauban). The mine was mistimed and blew after the infantry attack had commenced. Position: 49°59′33.9″N 2°45′25.6″E |
| 18 | Carnoy | No 7 | 230 kilograms (500 lb) | | | fired on 1 July 1916 | Located in the front sector allocated to XIII Corps (see Capture of Montauban). |
| 19 | Carnoy | No 10.3 | 230 kilograms (500 lb) | | | fired on 1 July 1916 | Located in the front sector allocated to XIII Corps (see Capture of Montauban). |

== Gallery ==
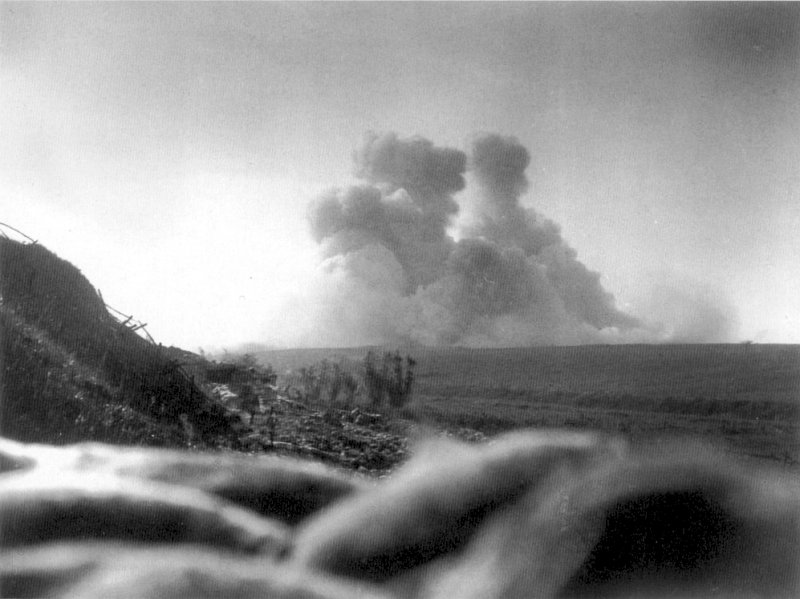
The explosion of the mine under Hawthorn Ridge Redoubt I, 1 July 1916 (Photo by Ernest Brooks)

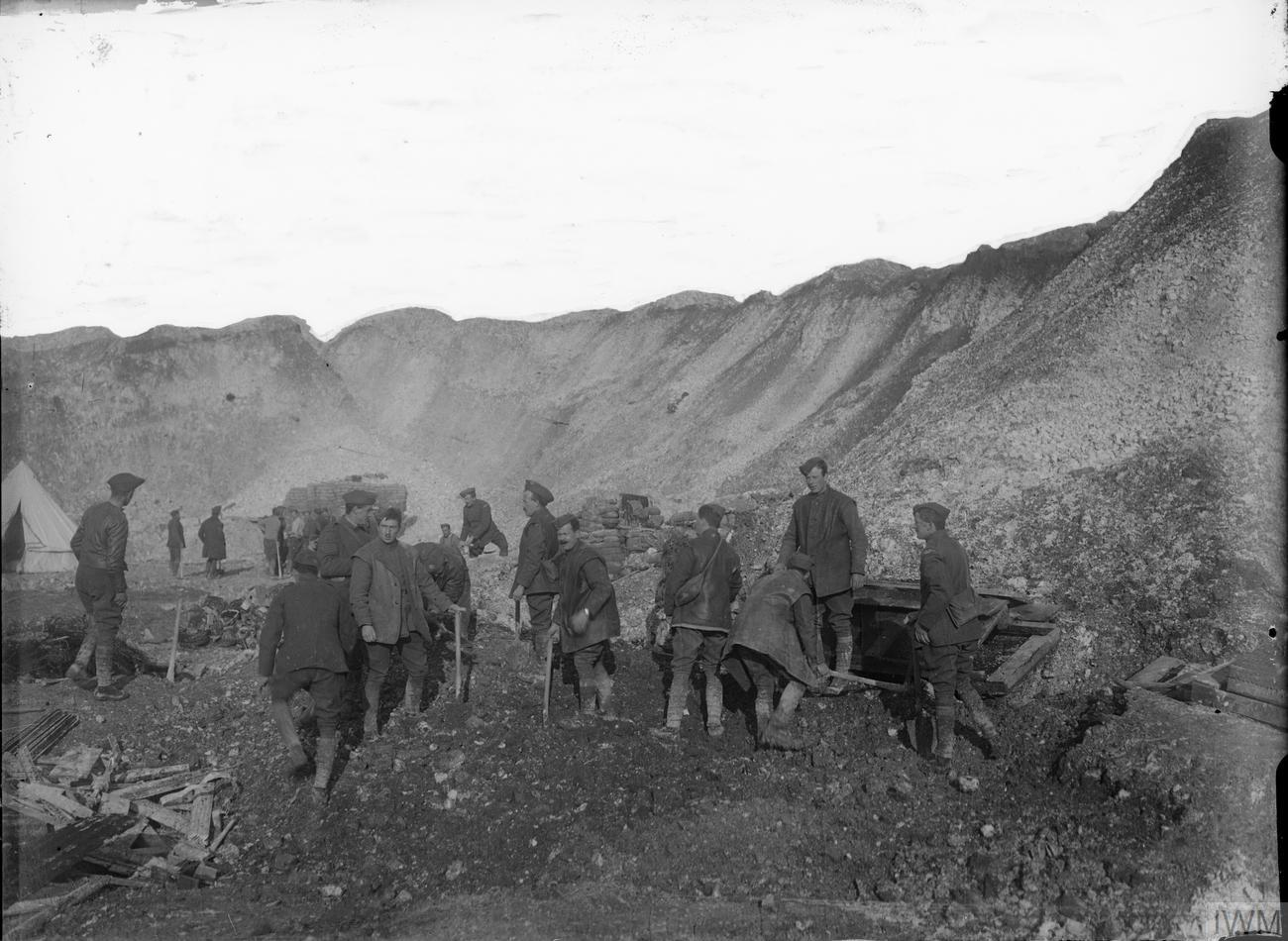
A working party in the Hawthorn Ridge mine crater, November 1916 (IWM Q 2006)

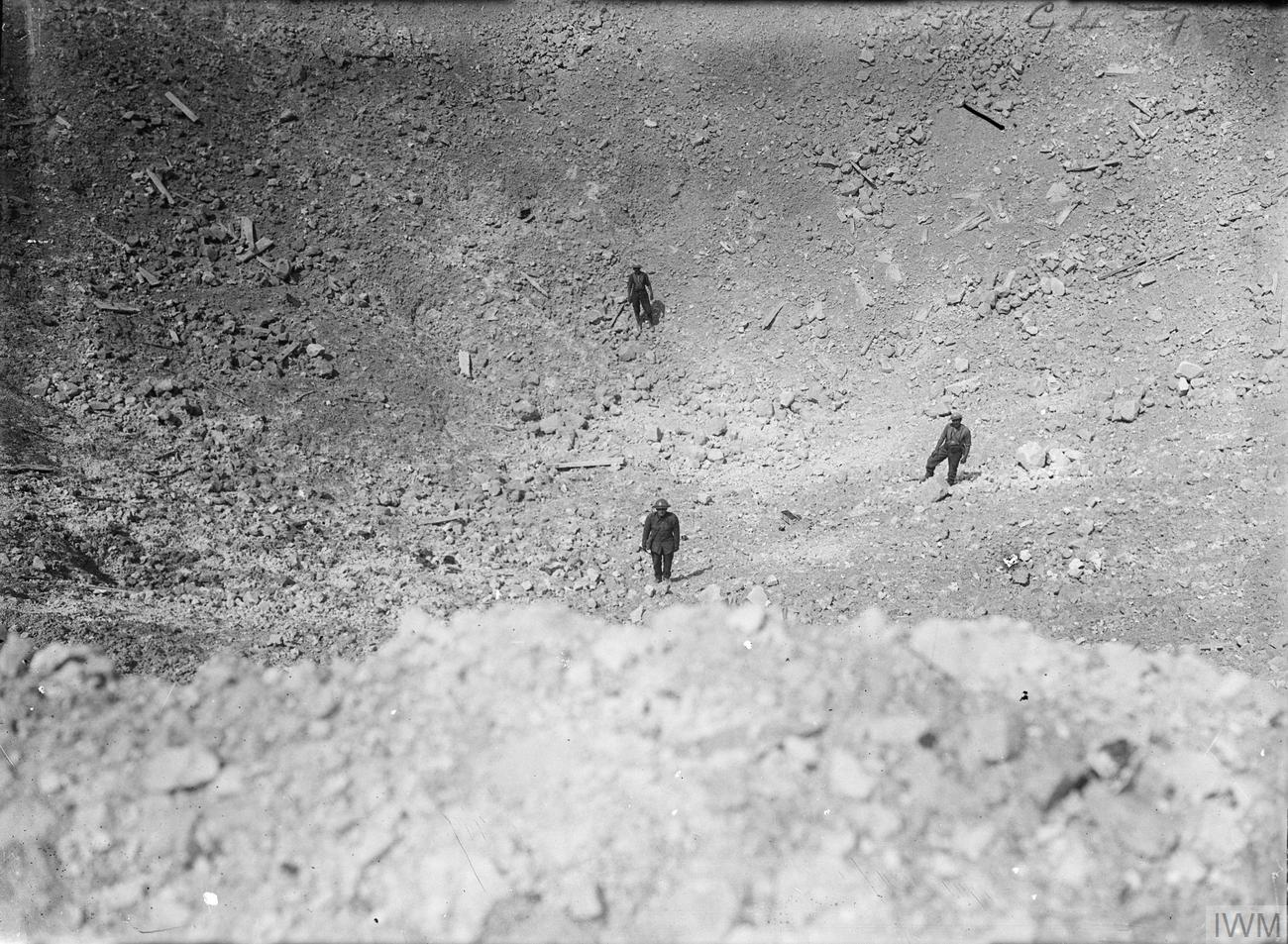
La Boisselle mine crater, August 1916 (IWM Q 912)

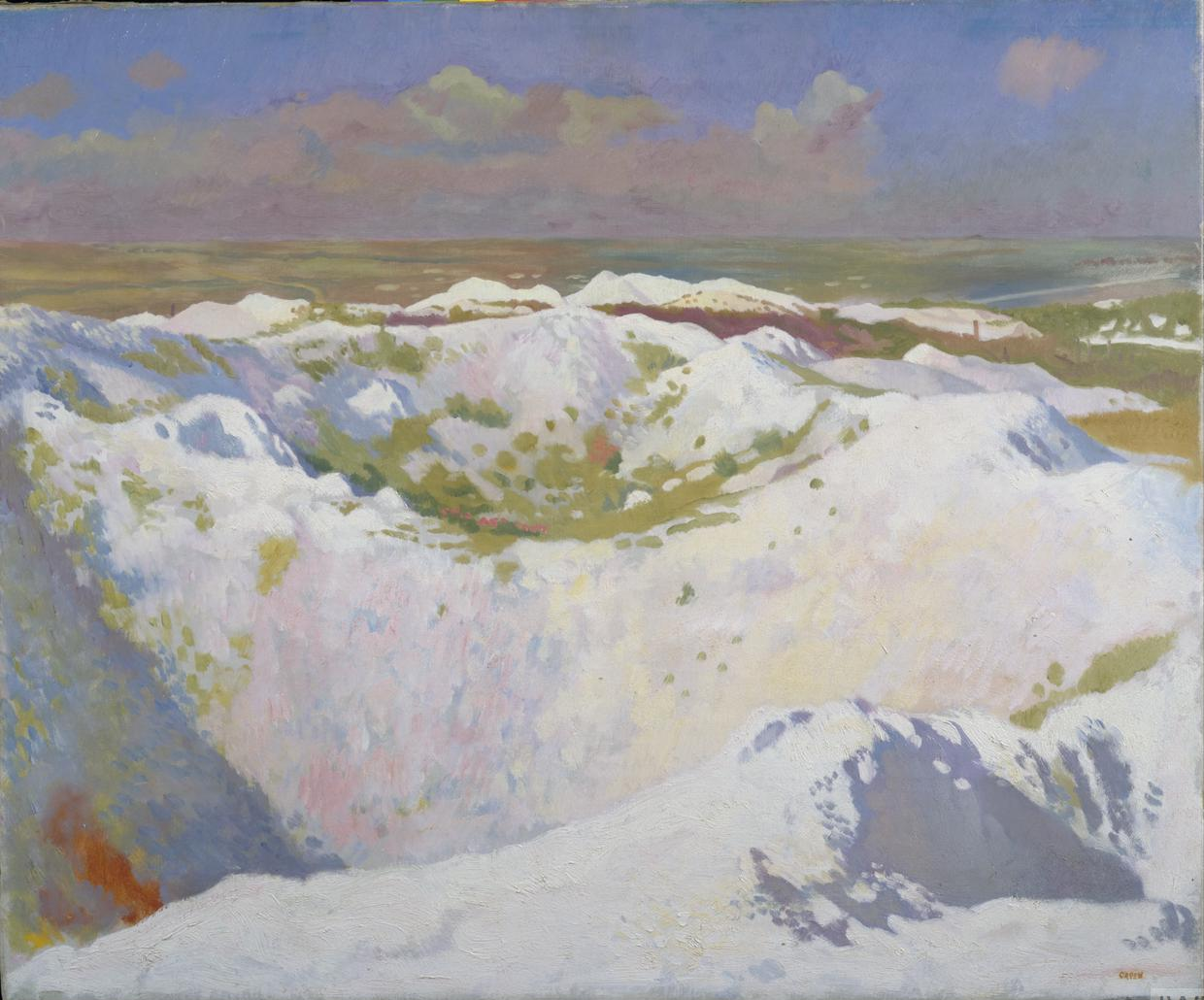
Orpen: Mines and the Bapaume Road, La Boisselle (Art.IWMART2962)

== See also ==
- Mines on the Italian Front (World War I)
