= Carnoy =

Commune in Somme, France

- Part of Carnoy-Mametz
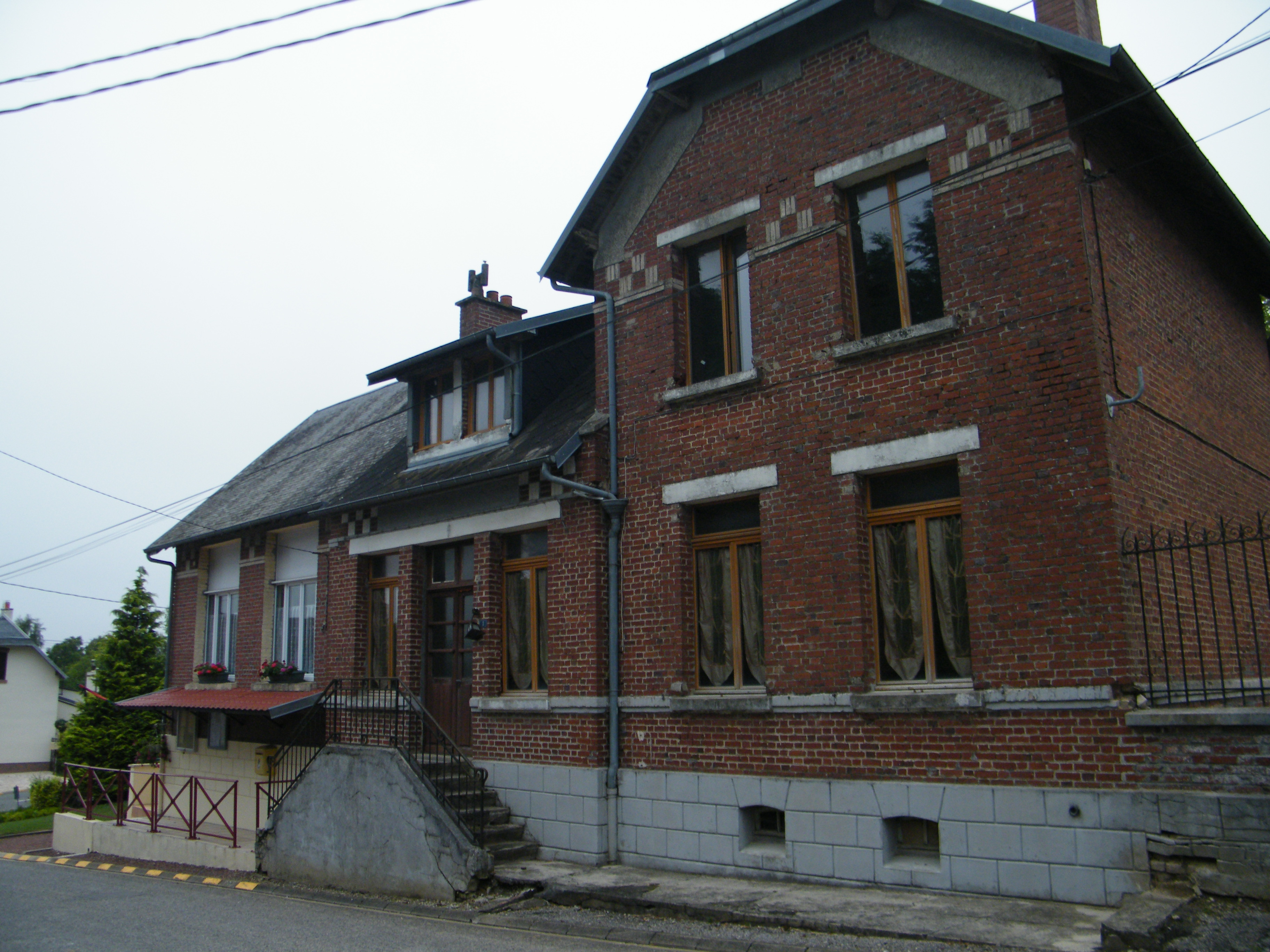
- The town hall in Carnoy
- Location of Carnoy
- Location within France Location within Hauts-de-France
- Coordinates: 49°59′07″N 2°45′18″E
- Country: France
- Region: Hauts-de-France
- Department: Somme
- Arrondissement: Péronne
- Canton: Albert
- Commune: Carnoy-Mametz
- Area^{1}: 3 km^{2} (1.2 sq mi)
- Elevation: 86 m (282 ft)
- Highest elevation: 126 m (413 ft)
- Lowest elevation: 79 m (259 ft)
- Population (2023): 91
  - Density: 30/km^{2} (79/sq mi)
- Time zone: UTC+01:00 (CET)
  - Summer (DST): UTC+02:00 (CEST)
- Postal code: 80300
- ^{1} French Land Register data, which excludes lakes, ponds, glaciers > 1 km^{2} (0.386 sq mi or 247 acres) and river estuaries.

Carnoy (French pronunciation: [kaʁnwa]; Picard: Carneu) is a former commune in the Somme department in Hauts-de-France in northern France. On 1 January 2019, it was merged into the new commune Carnoy-Mametz.

== Geography ==
Carnoy is situated on the D254 road, some 43 km (27 mi) northeast of Amiens.

== History ==
In the First World War, the area was the site of heavy fighting, particularly during the Battle of the Somme. It was also one of the sites where large British mines were exploded on the first day that battle.

== See also ==
- Communes of the Somme department
