= XV Corps (United Kingdom) =

British infantry corps during World War I

- XV Corps formation badge.
- Active: 1915–18
- Country: United Kingdom
- Branch: British Army
- Type: Field corps
- Part of: Fourth Army
- Engagements: World War I: Battle of the Somme 1916; Battle of Bazentin Ridge; Battle of Delville Wood; Battle of Guillemont; Battle of Ginchy; Battle of Flers-Courcelette; Battle of Morval; Battle of Le Transloy; German retreat to the Hindenburg Line; Operation Hush; Battle of the Lys; Second Battle of the Lys; Advance in Flanders; Final Advance in Flanders

XV Corps was a British infantry corps during World War I.

== World War I ==
XV Corps was formed in Egypt on 9 December 1915 and then reformed in France on 22 April 1916 under Lieutenant-General Sir Henry Horne. It took part in the Battle of the Somme in 1916.

=== Order of battle on 11 November 1918 ===
Prior to the armistice, the corps halted on the Schelde on 10 November 1918. It was composed of the following units, the 36th Division having been transferred from the X Corps on 9 November 1918:

- 14th (Light) Division (Major General Skinner)
- 40th Division (Major General Peyton)
- 36th (Ulster) Division (Major General Coffin)
- 3rd Cavalry Division (Major General Harmon)
- Corps Troops
  - V/XV Heavy Trench Mortar Battery
  - 15th Cyclist Bn
  - XV Corps Signal Company

== General Officers Commanding ==
Commanders included:

- 12 January – 12 April 1916 Lieutenant-General Henry Horne
- 22 April – 29 September 1916 Lieutenant-General Henry Horne
- 29 September 1916 – 12 April 1918 Lieutenant-General Sir John Du Cane
- 12 April – November 1918 Lieutenant-General Sir Henry de Beauvoir De Lisle
