= Tunnel warfare =

Use of tunnels and other underground cavities in wars

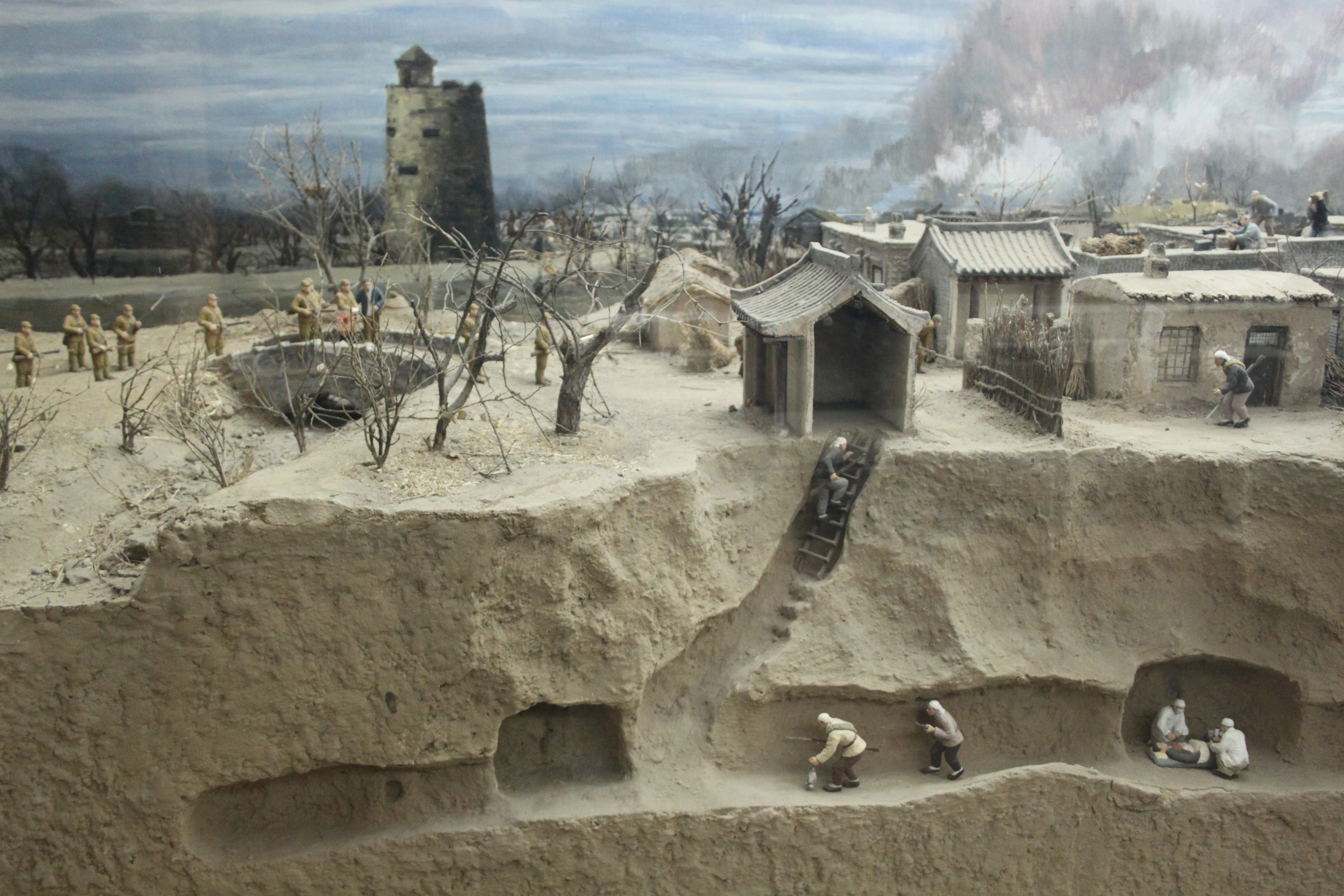
Diorama of defensive tunnels dug during the Second Sino-Japanese War

Tunnel warfare refers to aspects of warfare relating to tunnels and other underground cavities.

It includes the construction of underground facilities in order to attack or defend, and the use of existing natural caves and artificial underground facilities for military purposes. Tunnels can be used to undermine fortifications and slip into enemy territory for a surprise attack, while it can strengthen a defense by creating the possibility of ambush, counterattack and the ability to transfer troops from one portion of the battleground to another unseen and protected. Tunnels can serve as shelter from enemy attack.

Since antiquity, sappers have used mining against walled cities, fortresses, castles or other strongly held and fortified military positions. Defenders have dug counter-mines to attack miners or destroy a mine threatening their fortifications. Since tunnels are commonplace in urban areas, tunnel warfare is often a feature, though usually a minor one, of urban warfare. A good example of this was seen in the Syrian Civil War in Aleppo, where in March 2015 rebels planted a large amount of explosives under the Syrian Air Force Intelligence Directorate headquarters.

Tunnels are narrow and restrict fields of fire; thus, troops in a tunnel usually have only a few areas exposed to fire or sight at any one time. They can be part of an extensive labyrinth and have cul-de-sacs and reduced lighting, typically creating a closed-in night combat environment.

== Pre-gunpowder ==
=== Antiquity ===
==== Ancient Greece ====
The Greek historian Polybius, in his Histories, gives a graphic account of mining and counter mining at the Roman siege of Ambracia:

The Aetolians ... offered a gallant resistance to the assault of the siege artillery and [the Romans], therefore, in despair had recourse to mines and tunnels. Having safely secured the central one of their three works, and carefully concealed the shaft with wattle screens, they erected in front of it a covered walk or stoa about two hundred feet long, parallel with the wall; and beginning digging from that, they carried it on unceasingly day and night, working in relays. For a considerable number of days the besieged did not discover them carrying the earth away through the shaft; but when the heap of earth thus brought out became too high to be concealed from those inside the city, the commanders of the besieged garrison set to work vigorously digging a trench inside, parallel to the wall and to the stoa which faced the towers. When the trench was made to the required depth, they next placed in a row along the side of the trench nearest the wall a number of brazen vessels made very thin; and, as they walked along the bottom of the trench past these, they listened for the noise of the digging outside. Having marked the spot indicated by any of these brazen vessels, which were extraordinarily sensitive and vibrated to the sound outside, they began digging from within, at right angles to the trench, another tunnel leading under the wall, so calculated as to exactly hit the enemy's tunnel. This was soon accomplished, for the Romans had not only brought their mine up to the wall, but had under-pinned a considerable length of it on either side of their mine; and thus the two parties found themselves face to face.

The Aetolians then countered the Roman mine with smoke from burning feathers with charcoal, in essence an early form of chemical warfare.

Another extraordinary use of siege-mining in ancient Greece was during Philip V of Macedon's siege of the little town of Prinassos, according to Polybius, "the ground around the town were extremely rocky and hard, making any siege-mining virtually impossible. However, Philip ordered his soldiers during the cover of night collect earth from elsewhere and throw it all down at the fake tunnel's entrance, making it look like the Macedonians were almost finished completing the tunnels. Eventually, when Philip V announced that large parts of the town-walls were undermined, the citizens surrendered without delay."

Polybius also describes the Seleucids and Parthians employing tunnels and counter-tunnels during the siege of Sirynx.

==== Roman ====
The oldest known sources about employing tunnels and trenches for guerrilla-like warfare are Roman. After the Revolt of the Batavi, the insurgent tribes soon started to change defensive practices, from only local strongholds to using the advantage of wider terrain. Hidden trenches to assemble for surprise attacks were dug, connected via tunnels for secure fallback. In action, often barriers were used to prevent the enemy from pursuing.

Roman legions entering the country soon learned to fear this warfare, as the ambushing of marching columns caused high casualties. Therefore, they approached possibly fortified areas very carefully, giving time to evaluate, assemble troops and organize them. When the Romans were themselves on the defensive the large underground aqueduct system was used in the defense of Rome, as well as to evacuate fleeing leaders.

The use of tunnels as a means of guerrilla-like warfare against the Roman Empire was also a common practice of the Jewish rebels in Judea during the Bar Kokhba revolt (132–136 AD). With time the Romans understood that efforts should be made to expose these tunnels. Once an entrance was discovered fire was lit, either smoking out the rebels or suffocating them to death.

Well-preserved evidence of mining and counter-mining operations has been unearthed at the fortress of Dura-Europos, which fell to the Sassanians in 256/7 AD during Roman–Persian wars.

==== China ====
Mining was a siege method used in ancient China from at least the Warring States (481–221 BC) period forward. When enemies attempted to dig tunnels under walls for mining or entry into the city, the defenders used large bellows to pump smoke into the tunnels in order to suffocate the intruders.

=== Post-classical ===
In warfare during the Middle Ages, a "mine" was a tunnel dug to bring down castles and other fortifications. Attackers used this technique when the fortification was not built on solid rock, developing it as a response to stone-built castles that could not be burned like earlier-style wooden forts. A tunnel would be excavated under the outer defenses either to provide access into the fortification or to collapse the walls. These tunnels would normally be supported by temporary wooden props as the digging progressed. Once the excavation was complete, the attackers would collapse the wall or tower being undermined by filling the excavation with combustible material that, when lit, would burn away the props leaving the structure above unsupported and thus liable to collapse.

A tactic related to mining is sapping the wall, where engineers would dig at the base of a wall with crowbars and picks. Peter of les Vaux-de-Cernay recounts how at the battle of Carcassonne, during the Albigensian Crusade, "after the top of the wall had been somewhat weakened by bombardment from petraries, our engineers succeeded with great difficulty in bringing a four-wheeled wagon, covered in oxhides, close to the wall, from which they set to work to sap the wall".

As in the siege of Carcassonne, defenders worked to prevent sapping by dumping anything they had down on attackers who tried to dig under the wall. Successful sapping usually ended the battle, since the defenders would no longer be able to defend their position and would surrender, or the attackers could enter the fortification and engage the defenders in close combat.

Several methods resisted or countered undermining. Often the siting of a castle could make mining difficult. The walls of a castle could be constructed either on solid rock or on sandy or water-logged land, making it difficult to dig mines. A very deep ditch or moat could be constructed in front of the walls, as was done at Pembroke Castle, or even artificial lakes, as was done at Kenilworth Castle. This makes it more difficult to dig a mine, and even if a breach is made, the ditch or moat makes exploiting the breach difficult.

Defenders could also dig counter mines. From these they could then dig into the attackers' tunnels and sortie into them to either kill the miners or to set fire to the pit-props to collapse the attackers' tunnel. Alternatively they could under-mine the attackers' tunnels and create a camouflet to collapse the attackers' tunnels. Finally if the walls were breached, they could either place obstacles in the breach, for example a cheval de frise to hinder a forlorn hope, or construct a coupure. The great concentric ringed fortresses, like Beaumaris Castle on Anglesey, were designed so that the inner walls were ready-built coupures: if an attacker succeeded in breaching the outer walls, he would enter a killing field between the lower outer walls and the higher inner walls.

== Coming of gunpowder ==
A major change took place in the art of tunnel warfare in the 15th century in Italy with the development of gunpowder, since its use reduced the effort required to undermine a wall while also increasing lethality.

Ivan the Terrible took Kazan with the use of gunpowder explosions to undermine its walls.

Many fortresses built counter mine galleries, "hearing tunnels" which were used to listen for enemy mines being built. At a distance of about fifty yards they could be used to detect tunneling. The Kremlin had such tunnels.

Since the 16th century, during assault on enemy positions, saps began to be used.

The Austrian general of Italian origin Raimondo Montecuccoli (1609–1680) in his classic work on military affairs described methods of destruction and countering of enemy saps. In his paper on "the assaulting of fortresses" Vauban (1633–1707) the creator of the French School of Fortification gave a theory of mine attack and how to calculate various saps and the amount of gunpowder needed for explosions.

=== 19th century ===
==== Crimean War ====
As early as 1840 Eduard Totleben and Schilder-Schuldner had been engaged on questions of organisation and conduct of underground attacks. They began to use electric current to disrupt charges. Special boring instruments of complex design were developed.

In the Siege of Sevastopol (1854–1855) underground fighting became immense. At first the allies began digging saps without any precautions. After a series of explosions caused by counter mine action the allies increased the depth of the tunnels but began to meet rocky ground and the underground war had to return to higher levels. During the siege Russian sappers dug 6.8 kilometres (4.2 mi) of saps and counter mines. During the same period the allies dug 1.3 kilometres (0.81 mi). The Russians expended 12 tons of gunpowder in the underground war while the allies used 64 tons. Conditions in the tunnels were severe: wax candles often went out, sappers fainted due to stale air, ground water flooded tunnels and counter mines.

==== American Civil War ====
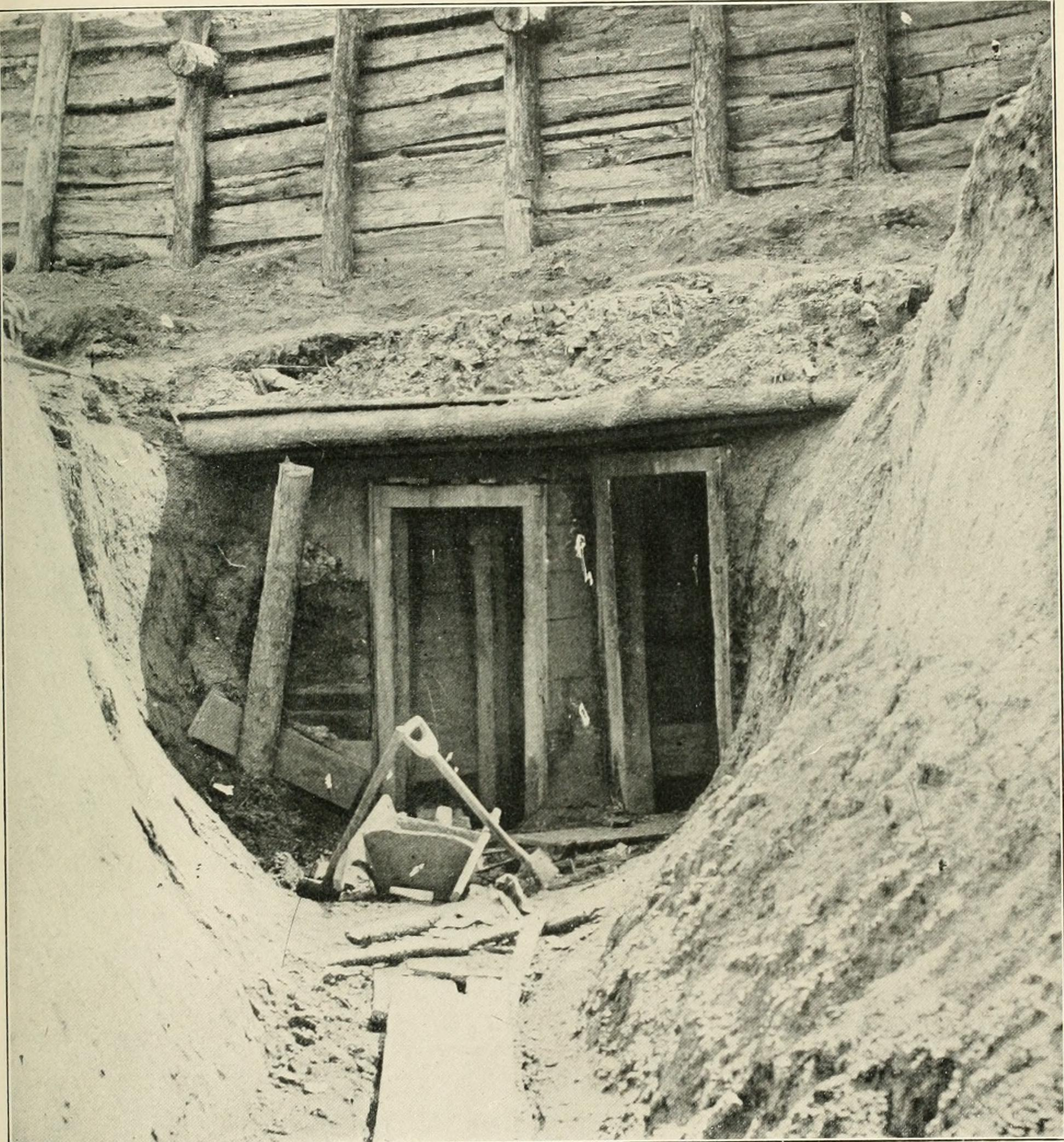
A Confederate counter mine burrow at Fort Mahone, Petersburg, Virginia

In 1864, during the Siege of Petersburg by the Union Army of the Potomac, a mine made of 3,600 kilograms (8,000 lb) of gunpowder was set off approximately 6 metres (20 ft) under Maj. Gen. Ambrose E. Burnside's IX Corps sector. The explosion blew a gap in the Confederate defenses of Petersburg, Virginia, creating a crater 52 metres (170 ft) long, 30 to 37 metres (100 to 120 ft) wide, and at least 9 metres (30 ft) deep. The combat was accordingly known as the Battle of the Crater. From this propitious beginning, everything deteriorated rapidly for the Union attackers. Unit after unit charged into and around the crater, where soldiers milled in confusion. The Confederates quickly recovered and launched several counterattacks led by Brig. Gen. William Mahone. The breach was sealed off, and Union forces were repulsed with severe casualties. The horror of this engagement was portrayed in the Charles Frazier novel, and subsequent Anthony Minghella movie, Cold Mountain.

During the Siege of Vicksburg, in 1863, Union troops led by General Ulysses S. Grant tunnelled under the Confederate trenches and detonated a mine beneath the 3rd Louisiana Redan on June 25, 1863. The subsequent assault, led by General John A. Logan, gained a foothold in the Confederate trenches where the crater was formed, but the attackers were eventually forced to withdraw.

== Modern warfare ==
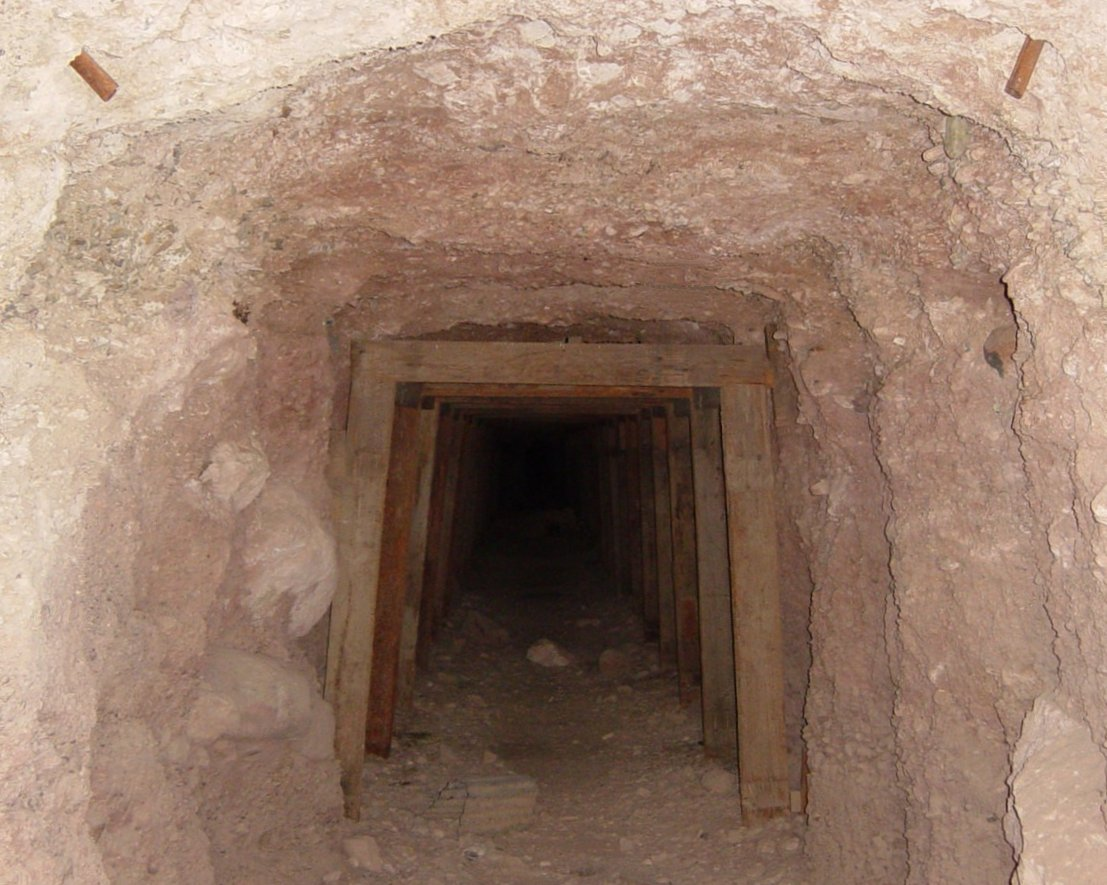
Example of a mine gallery with timber roof support

The increased firepower that came with the use of smokeless powder, cordite and dynamite by the end of the 19th century made it very expensive to build above-ground fortifications that could withstand any attack. As a result, fortifications were covered with earth and eventually were built entirely underground to maximize protection. For the purpose of firing artillery and machine guns, emplacements had loopholes.

=== World War I ===
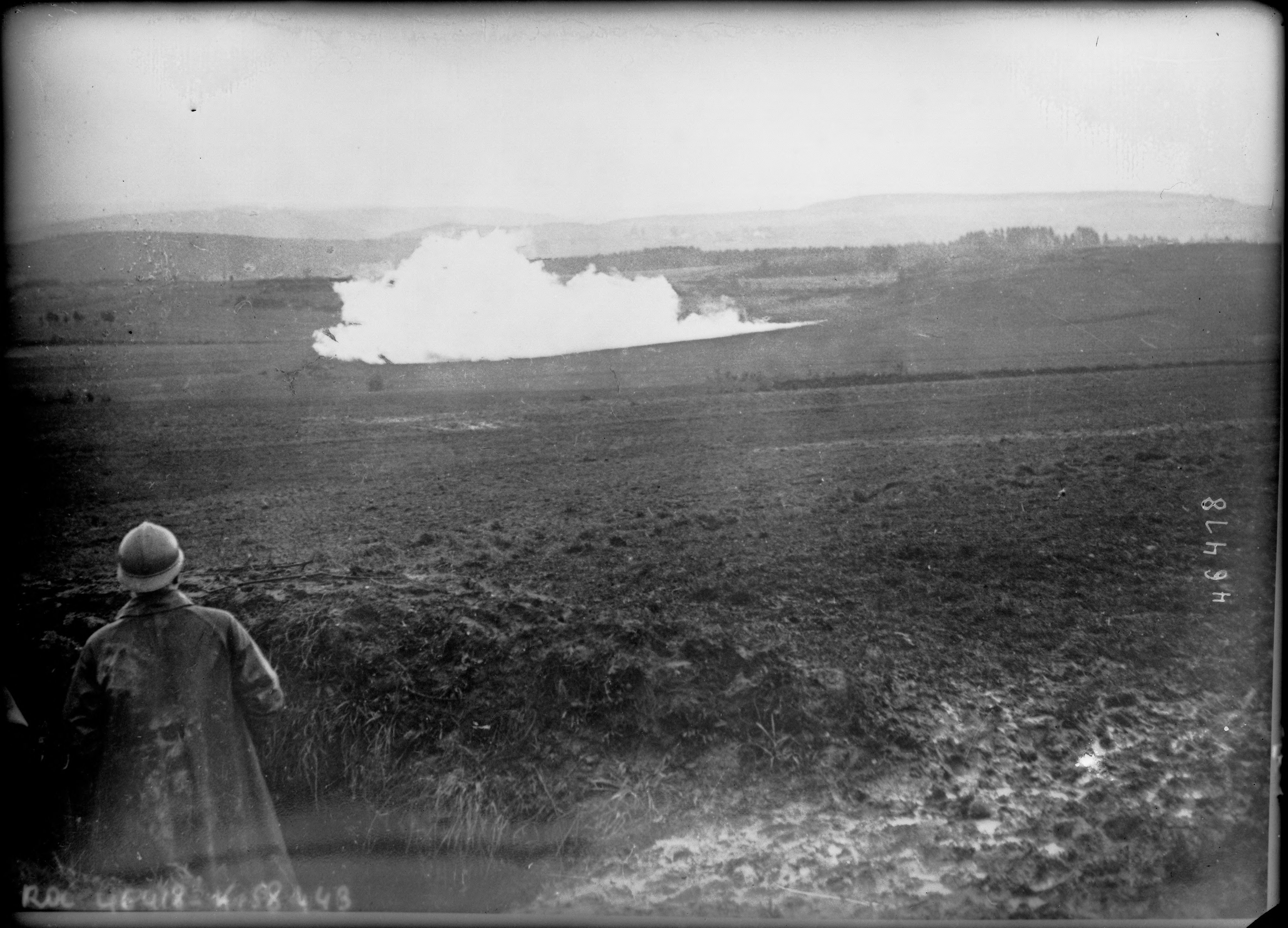
Explosion of a mine, as seen from a French position in 1916

Mining saw a particular resurgence as a military tactic during the First World War, when army engineers attempted to break the stalemate of trench warfare by tunneling under no man's land and laying large quantities of explosives beneath the enemy's trenches. As in siege warfare, tunnel warfare was possible due to the static nature of the fighting.

During the Gallipoli campaign, the Western and Italian Front during the First World War, the military employed specialist miners to dig tunnels.

On the Italian Front, the high peaks of the Dolomites range were an area of fierce mountain warfare and mining operations. In order to protect their soldiers from enemy fire and the hostile alpine environment, both Austro-Hungarian and Italian military engineers constructed fighting tunnels which offered a degree of cover and allowed better logistics support. In addition to building underground shelters and covered supply routes for their soldiers, both sides also attempted to break the stalemate of trench warfare by tunneling under no man's land and placing explosive charges beneath the enemy's positions. Their efforts in high mountain peaks such as Col di Lana, Lagazuoi and Marmolada were portrayed in fiction in Luis Trenker's Mountains on Fire film of 1931.

At Gallipoli and on the Western Front, the main objective of tunnel warfare was to place large quantities of explosives beneath enemy defensive positions. When it was detonated, the explosion would destroy that section of the trench. The infantry would then advance towards the enemy front-line hoping to take advantage of the confusion that followed the explosion of an underground mine.

It could take as long as a year to dig a tunnel and place a mine. As well as digging their own tunnels, the military engineers had to listen out for enemy tunnellers. On occasions miners accidentally dug into the opposing side's tunnel and an underground fight took place. When an enemy's tunnel was found it was usually destroyed by placing an explosive charge inside.

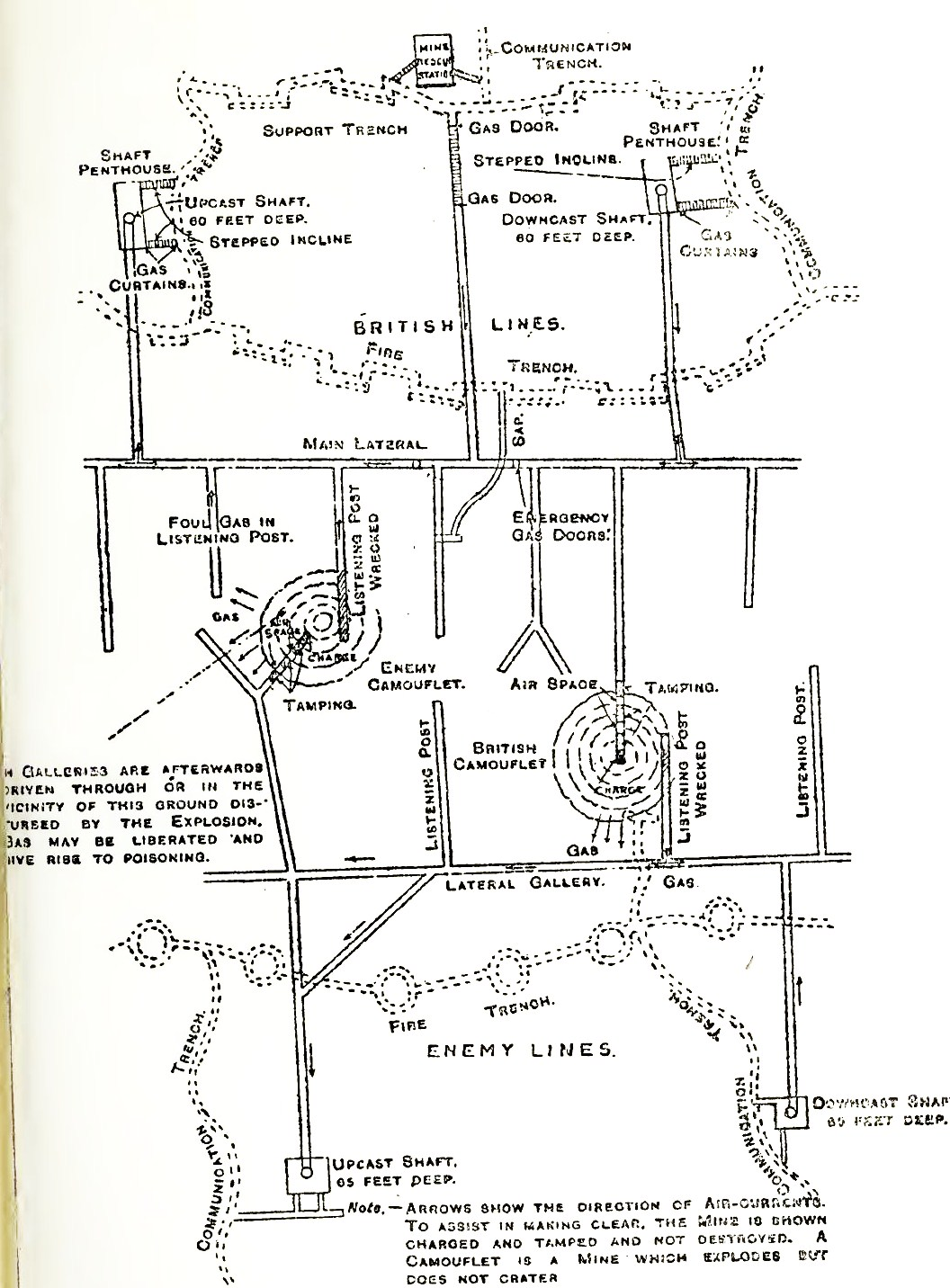
Plan of British tunnels, galleries and ventilation on a front in World War I

During the height of the underground war on the Western Front in June 1916, British tunnellers fired 101 mines or camouflets, while German tunnellers fired 126 mines or camouflets. This amounts to a total of 227 mine explosions in one month – one detonation every three hours. Large battles, like the Battle of the Somme in 1916 (see mines on the Somme) and the Battle of Vimy Ridge in 1917, were also supported by mine explosions.

Well known examples are the mines on the Italian Front laid by Austro-Hungarian and Italian miners, where the largest individual mine contained a charge of 50,000 kilograms (110,000 lb) of blasting gelatin, and the activities of the Tunnelling companies of the Royal Engineers on the Western Front. At the beginning of the Somme offensive, the British simultaneously detonated 19 mines of varying sizes beneath the German positions, including two mines that contained 18,000 kilograms (40,000 lb) of explosives.

In January 1917, General Plumer gave orders for over 20 mines to be placed under German lines at Messines. Over the next five months more than 8,000 m (26,000 ft) of tunnel were dug and 450–600 tons of explosive were placed in position. Simultaneous explosion of the mines took place at 3:10 a.m. on 7 June 1917. The blast killed an estimated 10,000 soldiers and was so loud it was heard in London. The near simultaneous explosions created 19 large craters and ranks among the largest non-nuclear explosions of all time. Two mines were not ignited in 1917 because they had been abandoned before the battle, and four were outside the area of the offensive. On 17 July 1955, a lightning strike set off one of these four latter mines. There were no human casualties, but one cow was killed. Another of the unused mines is believed to have been found in a location beneath a farmhouse, but no attempt has been made to remove it. The last mine fired by the British in World War I was near Givenchy on 10 August 1917, after which the tunnelling companies of the Royal Engineers concentrated on constructing deep dugouts for troop accommodation.

The largest single mines at Messines were at St Eloi, which was charged with 43,400 kilograms (95,600 lb) of ammonal, at Maedelstede Farm, which was charged with 43,000 kg (94,000 lb), and beneath German lines at Spanbroekmolen, which was charged with 41,000 kg (91,000 lb) of ammonal. The Spanbroekmolen mine created a crater that afterwards measured 130 metres (430 ft) from rim to rim. Now known as the Pool of Peace, it is large enough to house a 12 m (40 ft) deep lake.

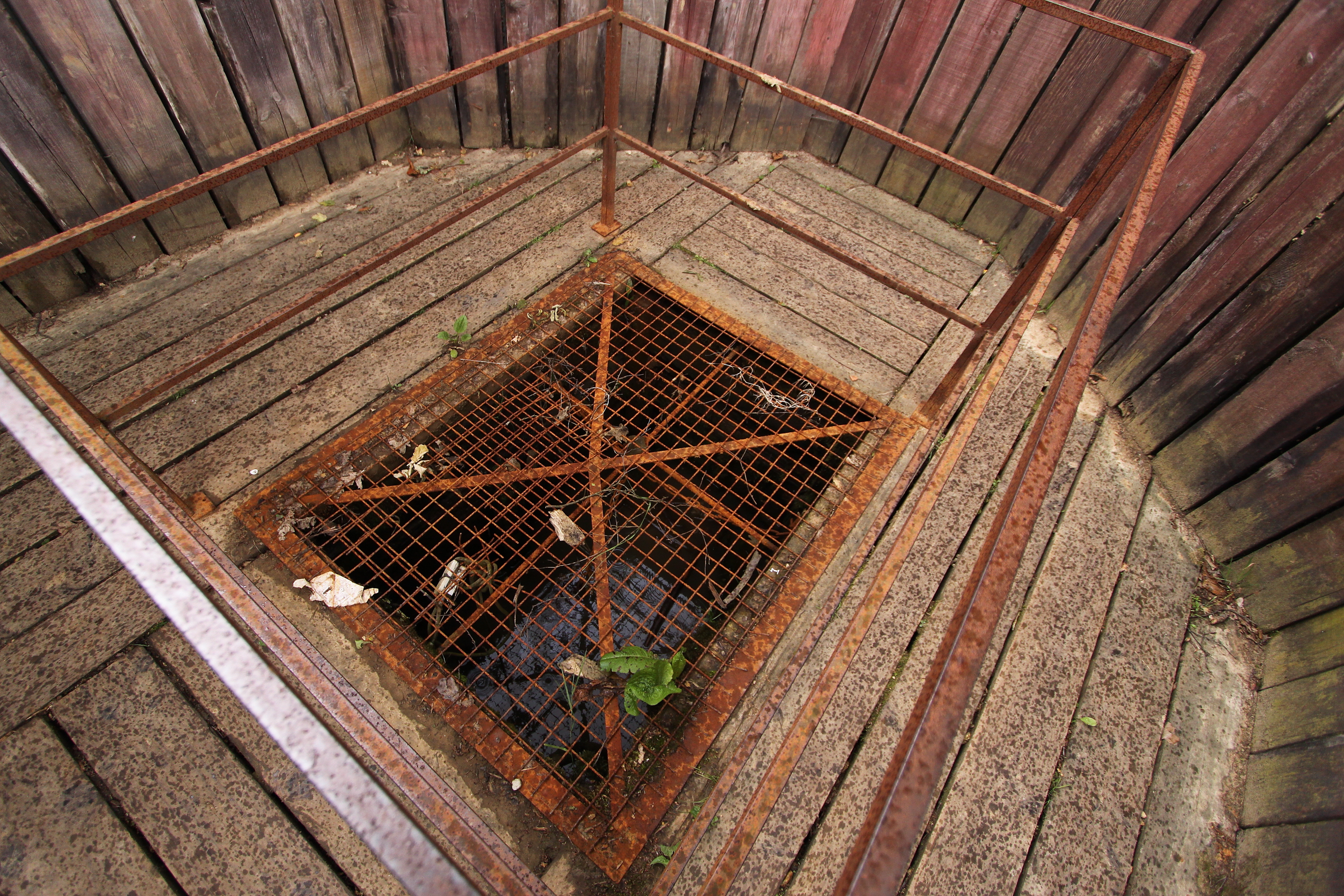
Access to German counter-mining shaft – Bayernwald trenches, Croonaert Wood, Ypres Salient

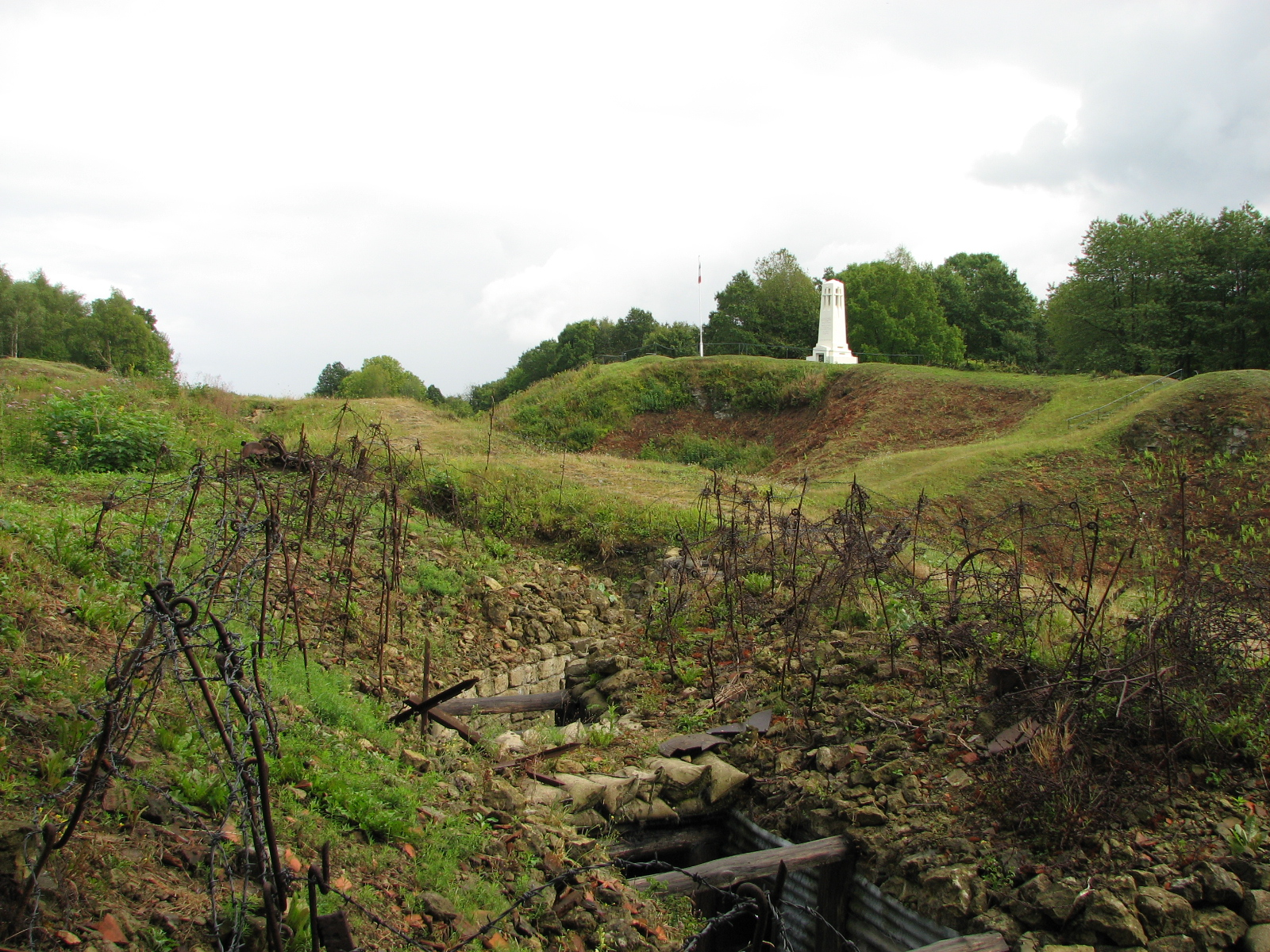
Mine craters – Butte de Vauquois memorial site, Vauquois, France

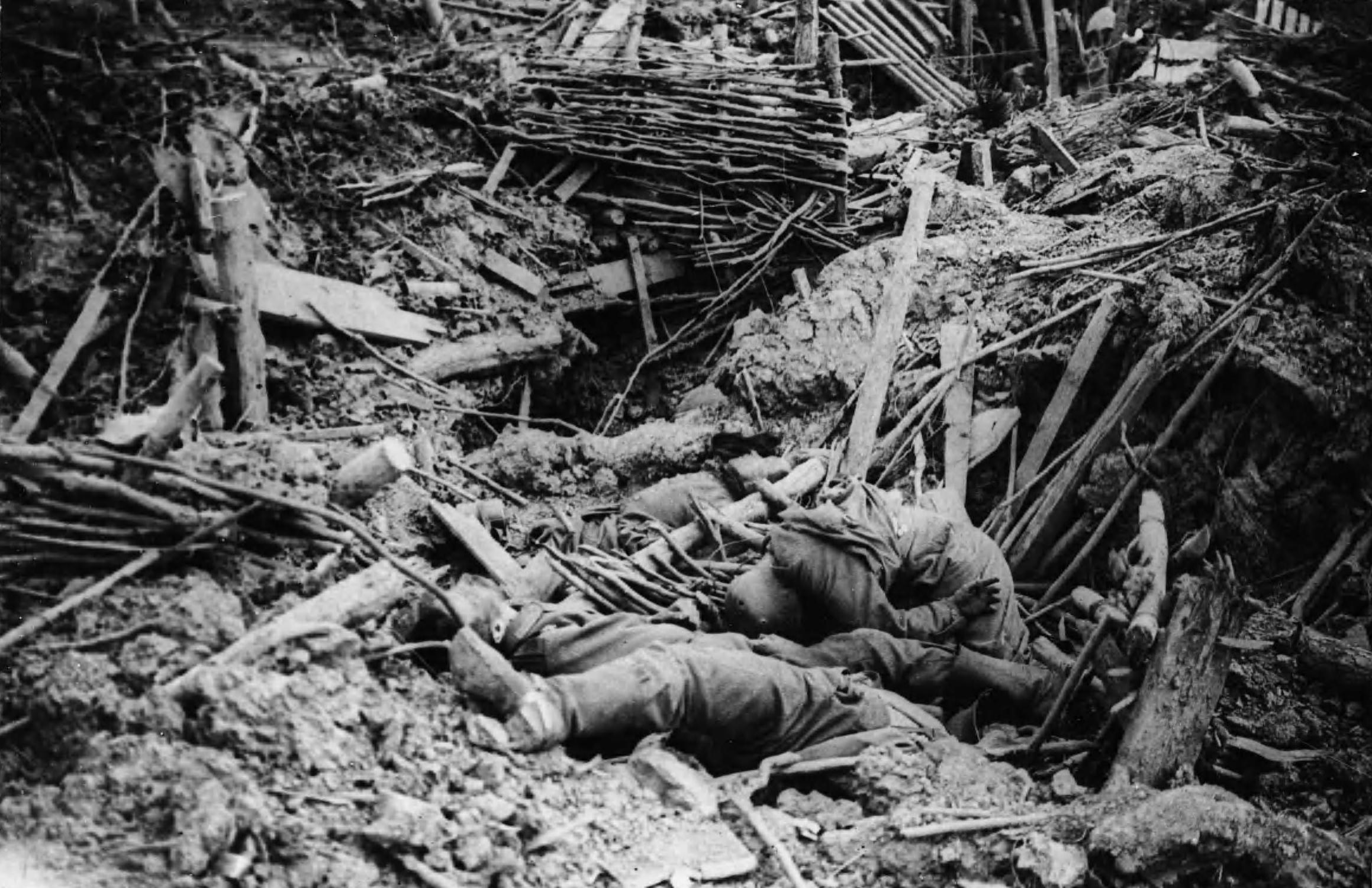
German trench destroyed by the explosion of a mine in the Battle of Messines. Approximately 10,000 German troops were killed when the mines were simultaneously detonated at 3:10 a.m. on 7 June 1917.

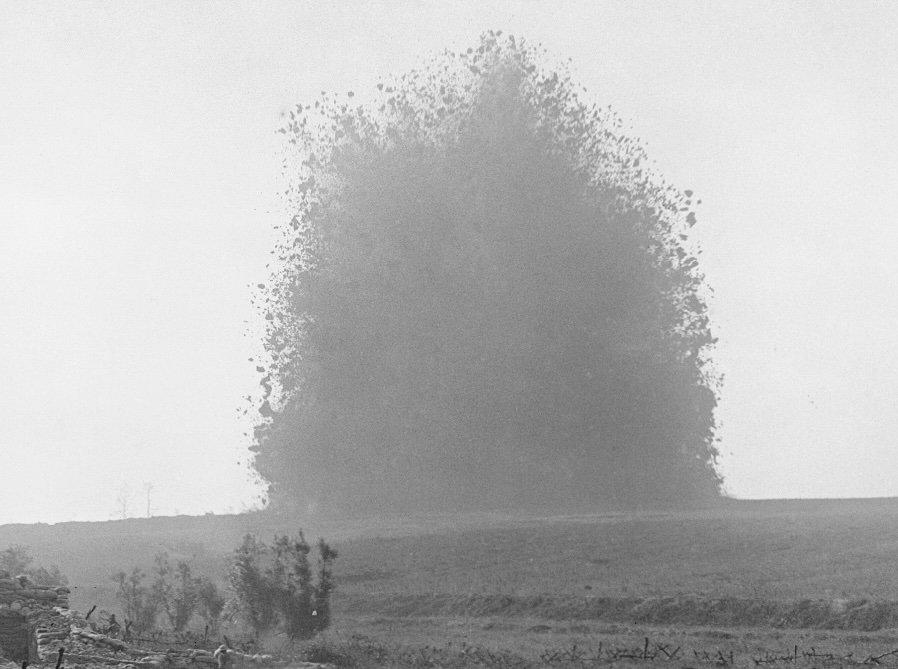
Explosion of the mine beneath Hawthorn Ridge Redoubt on the Western Front during World War I (July 1, 1916). Photo by Ernest Brooks

Most important areas of underground warfare on the Western Front
Country	Region	Location	Notes
Belgium	West Flanders	Ypres: Hooge	area of sustained fighting between British and German tunneling units 1915–1917; see Hooge in World War I
Belgium	West Flanders	Ypres: Hill 60	area of sustained fighting between British and German tunneling units 1915–1917; also see Mines in the Battle of Messines (1917)
Belgium	West Flanders	Ypres: St Eloi	area of sustained fighting between British and German tunneling units 1915–1917; also see The Bluff and Mines in the Battle of Messines (1917)
Belgium	West Flanders	Heuvelland: Wytschaete	fighting between British and German tunneling units, mainly in connection with the Mines in the Battle of Messines (1917)
Belgium	West Flanders	Messines Ridge	area of sustained fighting between British and German tunneling units, also see Mines in the Battle of Messines (1917)
France	Nord	Armentières	area of sustained fighting between British and German tunneling units
France	Nord	Aubers Ridge	fighting between British and German tunneling units, mainly in connection with the Battle of Aubers Ridge
France	Pas-de-Calais	Givenchy-lès-la-Bassée	area of sustained fighting between British and German tunneling units, area where William Hackett VC was killed
France	Pas-de-Calais	Cuinchy	fighting between British and German tunneling units
France	Pas-de-Calais	Loos-en-Gohelle	area of sustained fighting between British and German tunneling units
France	Pas-de-Calais	Givenchy-en-Gohelle	area of sustained fighting between British and German tunneling units, also in connection with the Battle of Vimy Ridge (1917)
France	Pas-de-Calais	Vimy Ridge	Between October 1915 and April 1917 an estimated 150 French, British and German charges were fired in this 7-kilometre (4.3 mi) sector of the Western Front. British tunnellers took over progressively from the French between February and May 1916. After September 1916, when the Royal Engineers had constructed defensive galleries along most of the front line, offensive mining largely ceased although activities continued through the Battle of Vimy Ridge (1917). The British gallery network beneath Vimy Ridge grew to a length of 12 kilometres (7.5 mi). Before the Battle of Vimy Ridge, the British tunnelling companies secretly laid a series of explosive charges under German positions in an effort to destroy surface fortifications before the assault. The original plan had called for 17 mines and 9 Wombat charges to support the infantry attack, of which 13 (possibly 14) mines and 8 Wombat charges were eventually laid.
France	Pas-de-Calais	Arras	fighting between British and German tunneling units, mainly in connection with the Battle of Arras (1917); also see Carrière Wellington
France	Somme	Beaumont-Hamel: Hawthorn Ridge	fighting between British and German tunneling units, mainly in connection with the Battle of the Somme (1916); for details, see Mines on the first day of the Somme
France	Somme	La Boisselle	area of sustained fighting between British and German tunneling units, major sites of underground warfare were Schwabenhöhe/Lochnagar, the Y Sap mine and the L'îlot/Granathof/Glory Hole site; for details, see Mines on the first day of the Somme
France	Somme	Fricourt	fighting between British and German tunneling units, mainly in connection with the Battle of the Somme (1916); for details, see Mines on the first day of the Somme
France	Somme	Mametz	fighting between British and German tunneling units, mainly in connection with the Battle of the Somme (1916); for details, see Mines on the first day of the Somme
France	Somme	Dompierre	fighting between French and German tunneling units
France	Oise	Tracy-le-Val: Bois St Mard	fighting between French and German tunneling units
France	Aisne	Berry-au-Bac	fighting between French and German tunneling units
France	Marne	Perthes-lès-Hurlus	fighting between French and German tunneling units
France	Marne	Aubérive: Butte de Tahure	fighting between British and German tunneling units, mainly in connection with the Battle of the Hills (1917)
France	Marne	Massiges: Main de Massiges	fighting between French and German tunneling units
France	Meuse	Forest of Argonne: La Fille Morte	fighting between French and German tunneling units
France	Meuse	Forest of Argonne: Bolante	fighting between French and German tunneling units
France	Meuse	Vauquois: Butte de Vauquois	area of sustained fighting, also in connection with the Battle of Verdun (1916). From 1915 to 1918, French and German tunneling units fired 519 separate mines at Vauquois, and the German gallery network beneath the hill grew to a length of 17 kilometres (11 mi).
France	Meuse	Vaux-lès-Palameix: Bois des Chevaliers	fighting between French and German tunneling units
France	Meurthe-et-Moselle	Reillon	fighting between French and German tunneling units
France	Haut-Rhin	Bernwiller: Ammerzwiller	fighting between French and German tunneling units

=== Chaco War ===
On May 10, 1933, Paraguayan troops used a tunnel to attack in the rear of the Bolivian troops. They were victorious.

=== World War II ===
==== Sino-Japanese War ====
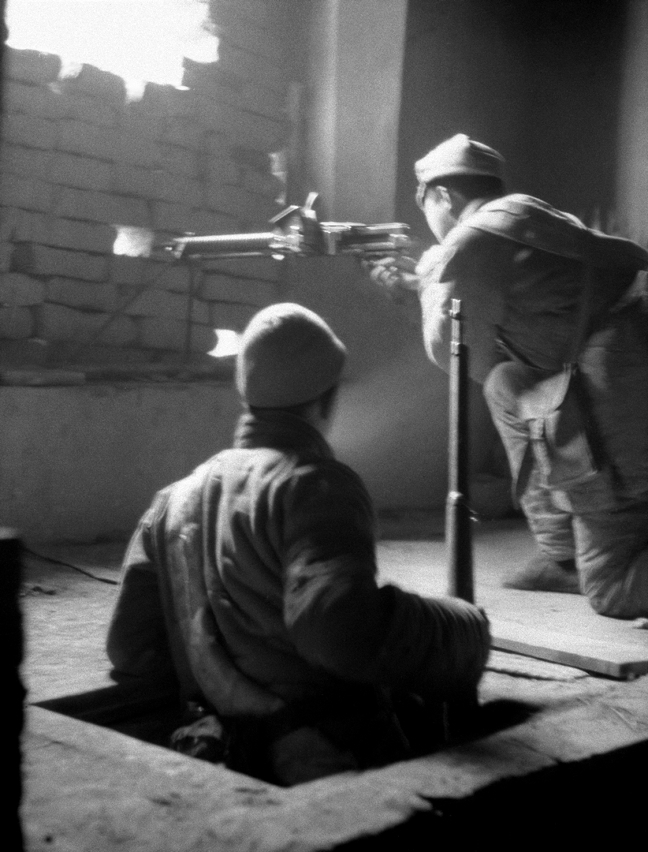
Tunnel Warfare During the Second Sino-Japanese War

The term tunnel war or tunnel warfare (地道战) was first used for the guerrilla tactic employed by the Chinese in the Second Sino-Japanese War. The tunnel systems were fast and easy to construct and enabled a small force to successfully fight superior enemies. One particular tunnel network called the "Ranzhuang tunnel" evolved in the course of resisting Japanese counterinsurgency operations in Hebei. Particularly, the Chinese Communist forces or local peasant resistance used tunnel war tactics against the Japanese (and later the Kuomintang during Chinese Civil War). The tunnels were dug beneath the earth to cover the battlefield with numerous hidden gun holes to make a surprise attack. Entrances usually were hidden beneath a straw mat inside a house, or down a well. This allowed for flexible manoeuvers or exits.

The main disadvantage of tunnel war was that usually the Japanese could fill the holes or pour water in to suffocate the soldiers inside the tunnels. This proved to be a major problem but was later solved by installing filters that would consume the water and poisonous gases. It is said that there were even women and children who voluntarily fought in the tunnels.

The movie Tunnel War, which is based on the stories about fighting Japanese in tunnels, made tunnel warfare well known in China. More films were soon produced and adapted in the same setting.

After the war, the Ranzhuang tunnel site became a key heritage preservation unit promoting patriotism and national defense education. Being a famous war tourism site in China, it attracted tens of thousands of visitors each year. Most of the villagers were working in tourism service industry, an industry worth US$700,000 each year.

==== US–Japan War ====
The first to copy tunnel warfare were the Japanese themselves. In the battles of the Western Pacific, they would maximize their capabilities by establishing a strong point defense, using cave warfare. The first encounter of the US Marines with this new tactic was the island of Peleliu. The invading marines suffered twice as many casualties as on Tarawa, where the old Japanese tactic of defending the beach had been employed. The pinnacle of this form of defense, however, can be found on Iwo Jima, where the Japanese engineered the whole Mount Suribachi with many tunnels leading to defensive emplacements, or exits for quick counterattacks. Tunnel warfare by the Japanese forced the US Marines to adopt the "blowtorch and corkscrew" tactics to systematically flush out the Japanese defenders, one cave at a time.

==== Australia–Japan Conflict ====
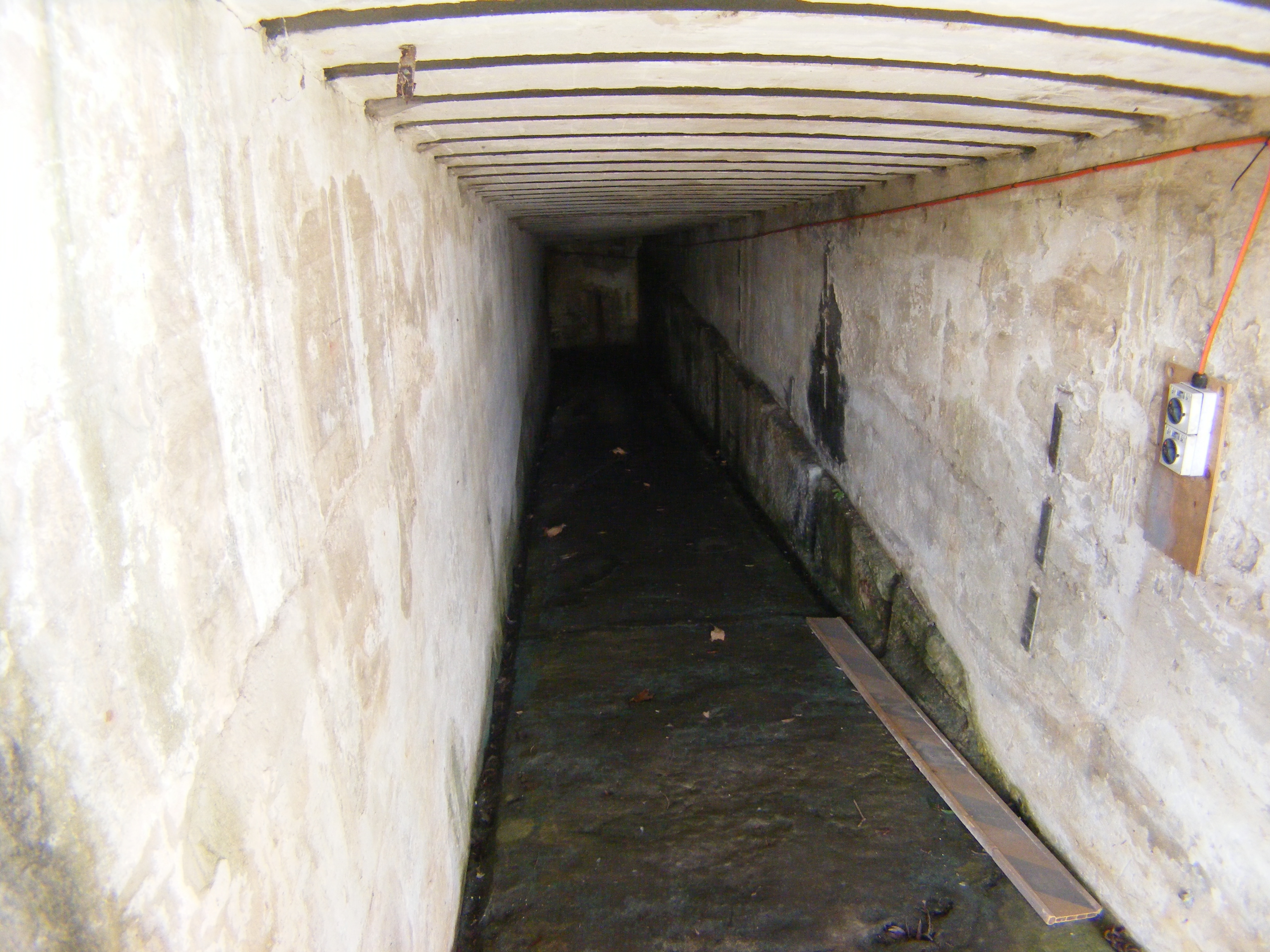
One of the tunnel systems in Sydney (Lower Georges Heights Commanding Position)

In Australia, the demand for protection from air attack became more serious in the early 1940s when there was significant axis naval activity in Australian waters and when three Japanese midget submarines entered and attacked the Sydney Harbour in 1942. In Sydney in 1941, the Royal Australian Navy excavated a series of tunnels to shelter over 2,500 men working at the naval base from air raids, and as well as to transport guns and ammunition within the tunnels after the Australian government and people expected a Japanese invasion of Australia.

There are other military fortifications in coastal Sydney that feature a tunnel warfare system, such as the Georges Head Battery (which was constructed in 1801 and was added to the New South Wales State Heritage Register in 1999), Lower Georges Heights Commanding Position (which was built in 1877 and became part of the Sydney Harbour defences, where the underground rooms and tunnels were used to store ammunition), Henry Head Battery (which was constructed in 1892 and was re-employed during World War II to defend the approaches to Botany Bay), the Middle Head Fortifications (a heritage-listed fort built in 1801), Malabar Battery (a coastal defense battery built in 1943) and the smaller Steel Point Battery.

In Wollongong, just south of Sydney, there exists the Illowra Battery and Drummond Battery. To the north of Sydney, in Newcastle, the Shepherds Hill military installations, a NSW state heritage-listed site, was built from 1890 to 1940 and consists of a former military gun battery emplacement, a 100 metres (330 ft) long tunnel and an observation post. As part of the strengthening of Newcastle's defense system, various new projects were undertaken at Shepherds Hill during WWII, such as accommodation for troops stationed. Fort Scratchley, which had close ties to Shepherds Hill, responded to an attack on Newcastle by a Japanese submarine in June 1942. This is the only place on the mainland of Australia known to have returned fire. The batteries at Shepherds Hill formed an integrated system with the batteries at Fort Scratchley, Fort Wallace at Stockton and at Tomaree on Port Stephens.

==== Japanese occupation of the Philippines ====
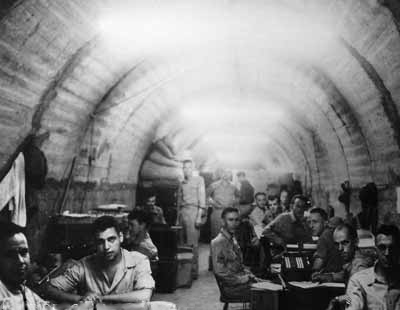
Finance office in Lateral 12, Malinta Tunnel, Corregidor, the Philippines

During the Japanese occupation of the Philippines, the Ilagan Japanese Tunnel was part of a military base built by the Japanese government as headquarters for its soldiers during World War II.

In the Philippines campaign (1941–1942), Philippines President Manuel L. Quezon, General MacArthur, other high-ranking military officers and diplomats and families escaped the bombardment of Manila and were housed in Corregidor's Malinta Tunnel. Prior to their arrival, Malinta's laterals had served as high command headquarters, hospital and storage of food and arms. In March 1942, several U.S. Navy submarines arrived on the north side of Corregidor. The Navy brought in mail, orders, and weaponry. During the re-taking of the island by U.S. forces in 1945, Japanese soldiers who had been trapped in the tunnel after the entrance was blocked as a result of gunfire from USS Converse (DD-509) began committing suicide by detonating explosives within the tunnel complex the night of 23 February 1945. The collapsed laterals resulting from these explosions have never been excavated.

During the Battle of Corregidor, the third lateral on the north side from the Malinta Tunnel's east entrance served as the headquarters of General Douglas MacArthur and the USAFFE. Malinta Tunnel also served as the seat of government of the Commonwealth of the Philippines. At the vicinity of the tunnel's west entrance in the afternoon of 30 December 1941, Manuel L. Quezon and Sergio Osmeña took their oaths of office as President and Vice-president of the Philippine Commonwealth in simple ceremonies attended by members of the garrison.

=== Korean War ===
On the Korean Peninsula, the underground war reached a massive scale. From experience in the Second World War, the US relied upon aviation. North Korean forces suffered heavy losses from air strikes which obliged them to construct underground shelters. Initially underground fortifications were built independently by individual units and their placement was chaotic. Subsequently, underground fortifications were united into a single large system. The length of the front was 250 kilometres (160 mi) while the length of tunnels was 500 kilometres (310 mi); for every kilometre of front, there were two kilometres of tunnels. A total of 2,000,000 cubic metres (71,000,000 ft^{3}) of rocks were extracted.

North Korea developed a theory of underground warfare. Manpower, warehouses and small calibre guns were completely housed underground making them less vulnerable to air strikes and artillery. On the surface, the many false targets (bunkers, trenches and decoy entrances to the tunnel system) made it difficult to detect true targets, forcing US forces to waste ammunition. Directly under the surface, spacious barracks were built, allowing whole units to be quickly brought to the surface for a short time and as quickly returned to shelter underground.

North Korea even created underground shelters for artillery. During bombing, artillery was rolled into bunkers located inside mountains. When a lull came, the guns were rolled back out onto a firing area, fired some shells, and rolled back into the bunker again. Unlike other examples of underground warfare, North Korean troops did not just remain in the tunnels. North Korean forces were sheltering in the tunnels from the bombing and shelling and awaiting US bayonet attacks. When US forces reached the ground in the area of the tunnels, chosen North Korean units would emerge to engage in hand-to-hand combat, taking advantage of their numerical superiority.

To this day, the North Korean strategy is to construct as many underground facilities as possible for military use in the event of a US attack. The depth of underground facilities reaches 80 to 100 m (260 to 330 ft), making them difficult to destroy even with the use of tactical nuclear weapons.

In the Korean War the tactic of tunnel warfare was employed by the Chinese forces themselves. "The Chinese resort to tunnel warfare, and the devastating losses to American soldiers, led to the sealing of tunnel entrances by United Nations Command. According to later prisoner of war interrogations, Chinese officers had killed a number of their own soldiers in the tunnels, because the latter had wished to dig their way out and surrender to the United Nations Command."

The Chinese People's Volunteer Army under General Qin Jiwei constructed an intricate series of defensive networks, which were composed of 9,000 meters (9,800 yd) of tunnels, 50,000 m (55,000 yd) of trenches and 5,000 m (5,500 yd) of obstacles and minefields. This tunnel network proved its use in the Battle of Triangle Hill in October and November 1952, where, despite the United States Eight Army enjoying complete air and artillery superiority, the Chinese managed to keep the hill and inflict heavy casualties on the Americans.

=== Vietnam War ===
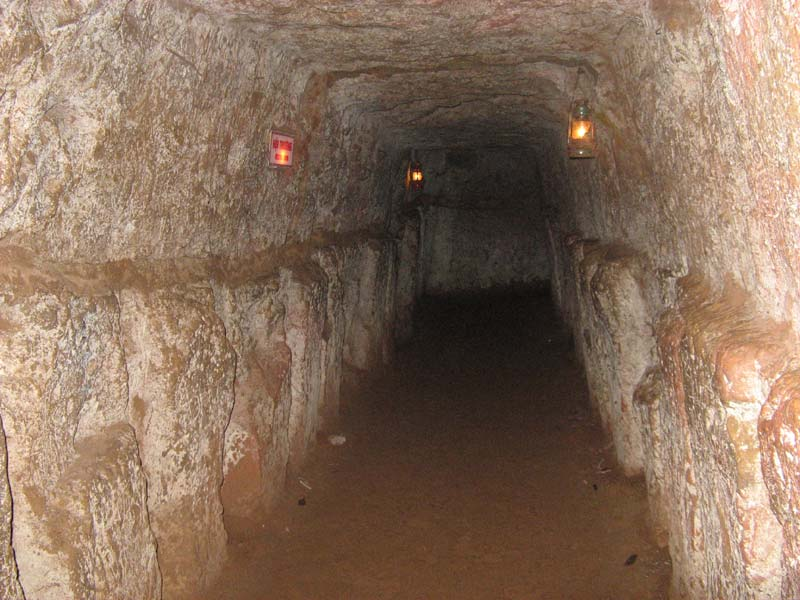
Vịnh Mốc tunnels, which were used to shelter people from the intense bombing of Son Trung and Son Ha communes

To maintain a full-scale guerrilla war in South Vietnam, camouflaged bases were used capable of supplying the guerillas for a long period of time. Throughout South Vietnam, there were secret underground bases that operated successfully. There are reports that every villager was obliged to dig 90 cm (35 in) of tunnel a day. The largest underground base was the tunnels of Cu Chi with an overall length of 320 km (200 mi). To combat the guerillas in the tunnels the US used soldiers dubbed tunnel rats.

Part of the Ho Chi Minh trail was based in caves made of karst.

When Vietnam became a French colony again after the Second World War, the Communistic Viet Minh started to dig tunnels close to Saigon. After the French army left (they were defeated at Dien Bien Phu) the tunnels were maintained to prepare for a possible war with South Vietnam would start. Ho Chi Minh, leader of North Vietnam, ordered the expansion of the tunnels after the Americans entered the war between the North and the South; the tunnels would be used by the Viet Cong. Systems of tunnels were not occupied temporarily for military purpose, but began to contain whole villages of people living permanently underground. The tunnel system contained a complete world below ground, featuring kitchens, hospitals, workshops, sleeping areas, communications, ammunition storage, and even forms of entertainment. The tunnels eventually became a target for American forces because the enemy not only hid in them, but further could strike anywhere in the vast range of the tunnel complex (hundreds of miles) without a single warning before disappearing again.

These tactics were also applied against the Chinese during the Sino-Vietnamese War. The Củ Chi tunnels, a complex of over 200 kilometres (120 mi) of tunnel systems, allowed NLF guerrillas during the Vietnam War to keep a large presence relatively close to Saigon.

=== Palestine Liberation Organization ===
During the Palestinian insurgency in South Lebanon in the 1970s, PLO leader Yasser Arafat instructed his top military commander Khalil al-Wazir (Abu Jihad) to construct a network of underground bunkers and tunnels under Beirut and the Ain al-Hilweh refugee camp to defend against a possible Israeli invasion. Wazir, who had previously travelled to China, Vietnam and North Korea, based this system on the Viet Cong's model, hiding huge quantities of military supplies and linking Beirut with the PLO's strongholds in Southern Lebanon. A Lebanese Army officer later said: 'We just do not know how many miles of these tunnels there are. Some are new, some are old. We have no maps. They may be booby-trapped. Who knows?'

The tunnels proved useful for the PLO in the 1982 Lebanon War against Israel, being essential in a surprise attack during the Battle of Sultan Yacoub where Palestinians captured three Israel Defense Forces soldiers, who were later exchanged for over 1,000 imprisoned Palestinians. Perhaps the most effective use of tunnels by the PLO were during the siege of the Ain al-Hilweh refugee camp, when the PLO managed to inflict relatively heavy losses on the IDF and considerably slow its projected advance towards Beirut. Israeli historian Gil'ad Be'eri has written:

The Refugee camps were heavily fortified, full of bunkers and fire positions. The Palestinian defence at Ein El Hilweh and other refugee camps was based on hand-carried anti-tank weapons such as the RPG (Rocket propelled grenade). (...) The IDF was not prepared for this kind of fighting, having at hand mainly armoured forces intended for use in open areas. The built-up area inhibited long-range weapons, created an equality between the tank and the RPG (often wielded by 13- or 14-year-old boys), and increased the number of Israeli casualties. (...) Palestinian resistance seriously disrupted the timetable of the planned rapid advance to Beirut. It took eight days before the final crushing of resistance in Ein El Hilweh. The method adopted by the army was to use loud-speakers to call upon the civilian population to move away, search the houses one by one, surround points of remaining active resistance and subdue them by overwhelming fire.

Imad Mughniyeh, one of Abu Jihad's most trusted lieutenants and member of Fatah's elite Force 17 during the 1982 Lebanon War, would go on to become a senior Hezbollah military commander and was instrumental in the construction of Hezbollah's own tunnel network leading up to the 2006 Lebanon War (see below).

=== Afghan War ===
An underground war was actively pursued in the Afghan War. Water pipes extend under the entire Afghan territory. In wartime, Afghans have used these tunnels to both hide and to appear suddenly behind the enemy force. To clear these tunnels, Soviet troops used explosives and gasoline. The most famous underground base of the Mujahideen and then the Taliban was Tora Bora; this tunnel system went to a depth of 400 meters and had a length of 25 kilometres (16 mi). To combat guerillas in Tora Bora, the United States used special forces.

Osama bin Laden had in 1987 established his base near the Afghan-Pakistani border, for his Afghan Arab fighters who would later form the core of al-Qaeda. The base was equipped with an extensive tunnel network constructed by al-Qaeda's military chief Mohammed Atef, later one of the masterminds of the September 11 attacks. In May and June 1987 Soviet forces attacked the base with heavy artillery, aerial bombardment and numerous ground assaults, in the Battle of Jaji. In the end, the Mujahideen successfully held their complex system of tunnels and caves named al-Masada just outside the village of Jaji, near the Pakistani border, from Soviet capture.

=== Bosnian War ===
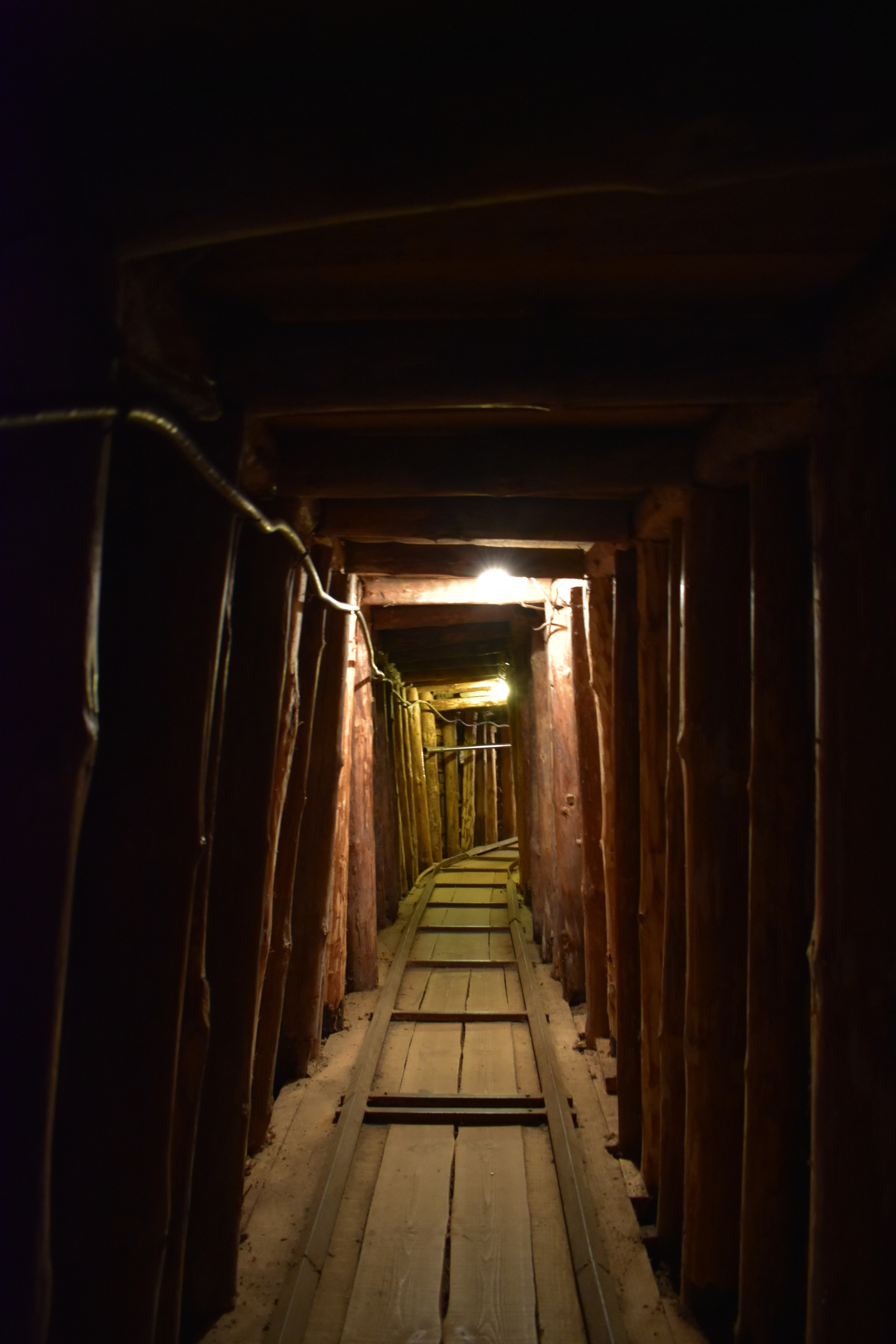
The Tunnel of Hope was established in June 1993 to link Sarajevo with Bosnian territory.

Between May 1992 and November 1995, during the Siege of Sarajevo in the Bosnian Army built the Sarajevo Tunnel in order to link the city of Sarajevo, which was entirely cut off by Serbian forces, with the Bosnian-held territory on the other side of the Sarajevo Airport, an area controlled by the United Nations. The tunnel linked the Sarajevo neighbourhoods of Dobrinja and Butmir, allowing food, war supplies, and humanitarian aid to come into the city, and people to get out. The tunnel was one of the major ways of bypassing the international arms embargo and providing the city defenders with weaponry.

The Sarajevo Tunnel is now converted into a war museum, with 20 metres (66 ft) of the original tunnel open for tourists visit.

=== 21st century ===
Due to the prevalence of bunker-busting munitions and combined arms maneuver warfare there has been a simple lack of need for such operations since the mid 20th century, making tunneling extremely rare outside of insurgencies (which often cannot use either of the former).

==== Syrian Civil War ====
During the Syrian civil war, rebel groups like the Islamic Front, Al-Nusra and ISIS dug tunnels and used explosives to attack fixed military positions of the Syrian Armed Forces and allied militias. A notable example is the attack on the Air Force Intelligence Building in Aleppo where on 4 March 2015, rebel forces detonated a large quantity of explosives in a tunnel dug close to or under the building. The building suffered a partial collapse as a result of the explosion which was immediately followed by an armed rebel assault.

==== Lebanese-Israeli War ====
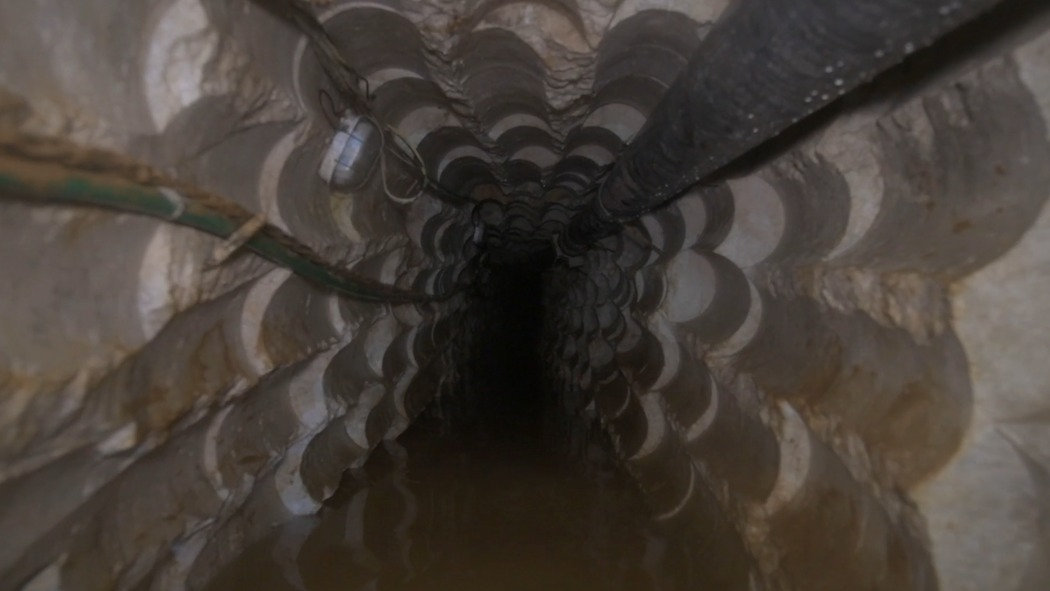
A Hezbollah tunnel that reaches a depth of 80 metres (260 ft)

In July 2006, a group of Hezbollah operatives crossed from southern Lebanon into northern Israel killing three Israeli soldiers and abducting two, which started the Lebanese-Israeli war. Faced with Israeli's air attacks, Hezbollah needed to create a defensive system that would enable these rocket attacks to continue uninterrupted throughout any conflict with Israel. To do so they created an intricate system of tunnels and underground bunkers, anti-tank units, and explosive-ridden areas.

Hezbollah built a sophisticated network of tunnels with North Korean assistance, with close resemblance to North Korea's own network of tunnels in the demilitarized zone separating the two Koreas. The underground network included twenty-five kilometer tunnels, bunkers, fiber optics communication systems, and storerooms to hold missiles and ammunition. Its capabilities were extended by Iranian supply of advanced weaponry and in-depth training of Hezbollah operatives. In addition to the tunnel network built in southern Lebanon, Hezbollah has constructed tunnels beneath the southern suburbs of Beirut, where its headquarters are located and where it stores missiles. Analysts also suggest that the group maintains tunnels along the Syrian border, facilitating the smuggling of weapons from Iran.

Between December 2018 and January 2019, the Israeli military destroyed six tunnels built by Hezbollah along Israel's border during Operation Northern Shield. In October 2024, during a ground offensive against Hezbollah, the IDF again targeted tunnels in southern Lebanon, later reporting the discovery and destruction of over 50 tunnel shafts in the area.

==== Israel-Gaza conflict ====
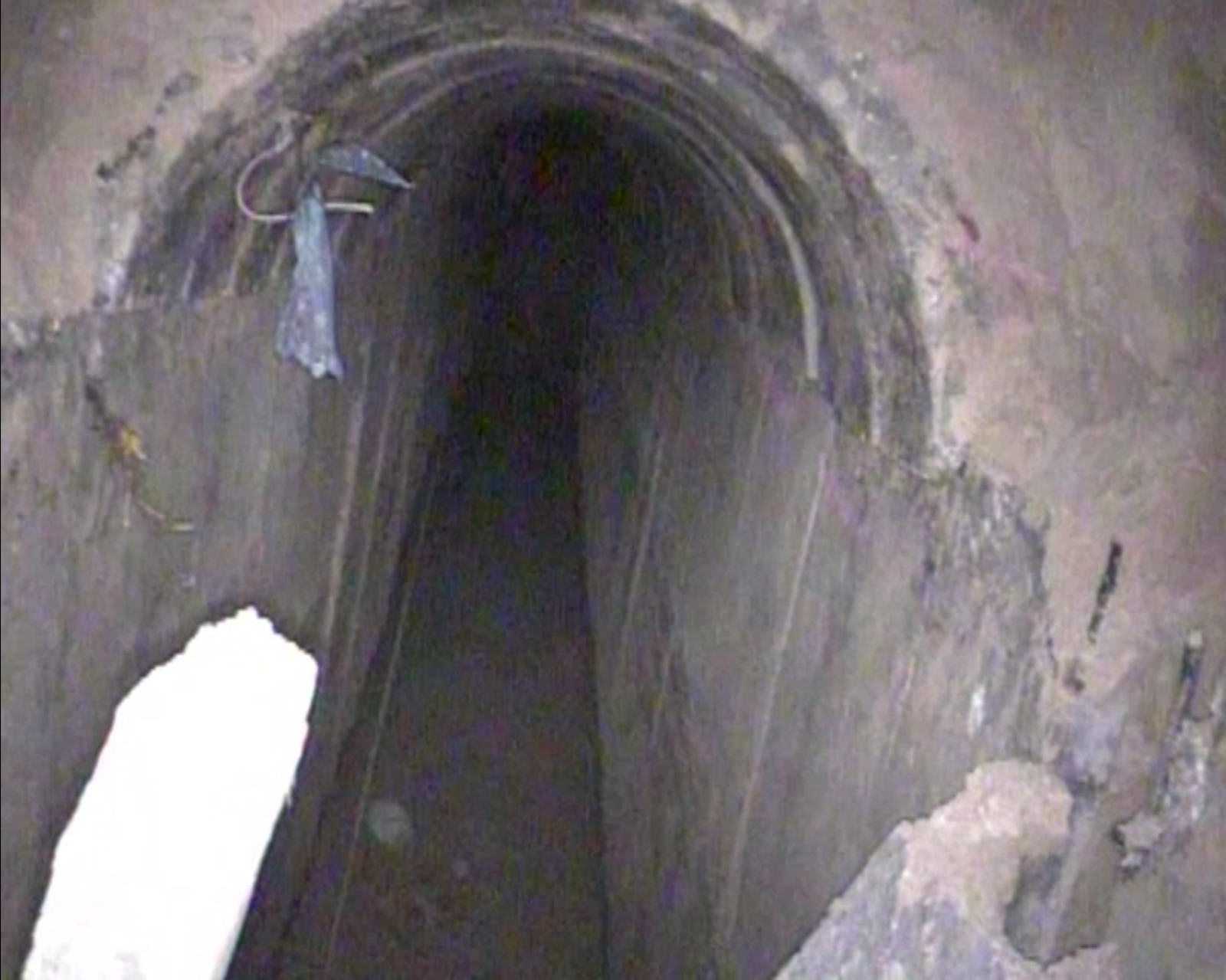
A Palestinian tunnel coming into Israel from the Gaza Strip, uncovered by the Israeli military between Kissufim and Nirim, 10 December 2017

The ongoing conflict between Israeli Ground Forces and Palestinian militants in the Hamas-governed Gaza Strip has sometimes been referred to as a tunnel conflict.

Hamas has constructed an extensive network of tunnels under Gaza City and other populated areas of the Gaza Strip, sometimes called the Gaza metro. The network is over 500 km (300 mi) in length according to Hamas claims. According to experts, these tunnels serve multiple purposes for Hamas, including holding kidnapped hostages, smuggling goods, moving militants, storing weapons, and sheltering Hamas members and infrastructure. However, the location and use of military tunnels in densely populated areas have raised concerns about Hamas endangering civilians.

In 2017, the Israeli government began constructing an anti-tunnel barrier along the Gaza–Israel border to prevent the digging of cross-border attack tunnels. On October 30 of that same year, such a tunnel was located within Israeli borders and destroyed.

It has been reported during the ongoing Gaza war that Hamas has dug extremely extensive tunnels under Gaza, and that capturing and destroying the tunnels is a "top priority" of the IDF. A 2024 Royal United Services Institute report details Hamas's use of two types of tunnels: deep, well-equipped ones for high-ranking commanders and shallower ones for lower-level members. Initially, the Israeli Defense Forces (IDF) planned to secure territory before searching for tunnels, but this strategy allowed Hamas to launch ambushes from underground. This experience highlighted the need for effective counter-tunnel operations to combine both surface and subterranean combat, while also addressing the risk of friendly fire. See Subterranean warfare#Gaza war for more on the subject.

==== Russian invasion of Ukraine ====
In 2022, Ukrainian resistance managed to hold off the Russian invading army for 80 days by using tunnels underneath the city of Mariupol. By April 2022, Russian and separatist troops had pushed deep into most of the city, separating the last Ukrainian troops from the few pockets of Ukrainian troops retreating into the Azovstal Iron and Steel Works, which contains a complex of bunkers and tunnels which could even resist a nuclear bombing.

In January 2024, Russian forces used tunneling tactics during the battle of Avdiivka to break through Ukrainian positions in the south of the city. According to Ukrainska Pravda and a separate 5 Kanal report, Russian tunnelers supplied with oxygen tanks entered the local underground drainage network near Spartak and began digging tunnels and clearing debris in an abandoned service water pipe "for several days", creating exit holes every 100 metres. Beginning around 15 January, reconnaissance teams then used the 1.3–1.4 metres high passage to infiltrate "about a kilometer" forward and conduct sneak attacks on Ukrainian positions, with varying degrees of success. According to Russian sources, the tunneling operation occurred over several weeks as Russian scouts cleared the flooded 0.5 metre-wide drainage pipe of icy water and cut holes into it using power tools, covering up the noise of the operation with mortar and artillery fire. As many as 150 special operations personnel used the network to infiltrate 2 km and emerge behind Ukrainian positions near the "Tsarska Okhota" park, capturing the fortification, according to Russian sources.

In July 2024, during the battle of Toretsk, the same Russian units that participated in the Avdiivka tunnel raid managed to cut into the Ukrainian defences near Pivnichne and Druzhba to a depth of 3–5 kilometers using a multi-kilometer tunnel they had dug under Ukrainian strongholds.

In March 2025, Russian forces traveled through the disused Urengoy–Pomary–Uzhhorod pipeline to infiltrate behind Ukrainian lines near Sudzha during the Kursk offensive.

In September 2025, during the Kupyansk offensive, Russian forces used a gas pipeline to travel from Lyman Pershiy to the village of Radkivka in an effort to infiltrate the city. The route reportedly took four days and had established resting and resupply points. The troops used custom-built wheeled platforms and e-scooters to move through the pipe, and after emerging, infiltrated the city under the cover of a Russian-controlled forest to the south of the village.

== See also ==
- Attrition warfare
- Breastwork (fortification)
- Early thermal weapons
- Explosive mine
- Land mine
- Maneuver warfare
- Sapper
- Sapping
- Siege warfare
- Subterranean warfare
- Trench warfare

== General references ==
- Ebrey, Walthall, Palais (2006). East Asia: A Cultural, Social, and Political History. Boston: Houghton Mifflin Company.
- Ernst, O. H. (1873). A Manual Of Practical Military Engineering, Prepared for the Use of the Cadets of the U. S. Military Academy, and for Engineer Troops. New York: D. Van Nostrand.
- Ulmer, D. S. (2008). Shaping Operational Design: A Counter to the Growing Trend of Underground Facilities and Tunnel Warfare. Air Command and Staff College.
- Zhang, Song Shan (张嵩山) (2010), Decipher Shangganling (解密上甘岭) (in Chinese), Beijing: Beijing Publishing House, ISBN 978-7-200-08113-8
