= Dobrinja mortar attack =

1993 massacre of Bosnian civilians in Sarajevo

Coordinates: 43°49′41″N 18°20′49″E

The Dobrinja mortar attack was a massacre which occurred at 10:20 a.m. on 1 June 1993, in Dobrinja, a suburb west of Sarajevo in Bosnia and Herzegovina. Two mortar rounds were fired from Serb-held positions, hitting a football pitch where youths put on an impromptu game on the first day of the Muslim holiday Kurban Bajram. Approximately 200 people were in attendance to watch the game. The United Nations placed the official death toll stemming from the mortar attack at 13 (news reports at the time published numbers ranging from 11 to 15 deaths), with 133 wounded. At the time it was the deadliest event involving civilians since the imposition of sanctions against the Federal Republic of Yugoslavia by the United Nations one year prior.
