= Steel Point Battery =

Fort on the shores of Sydney Harbour, Australia

South Head Battery
- Burroway
- South Head; Near Vaucluse in Australia
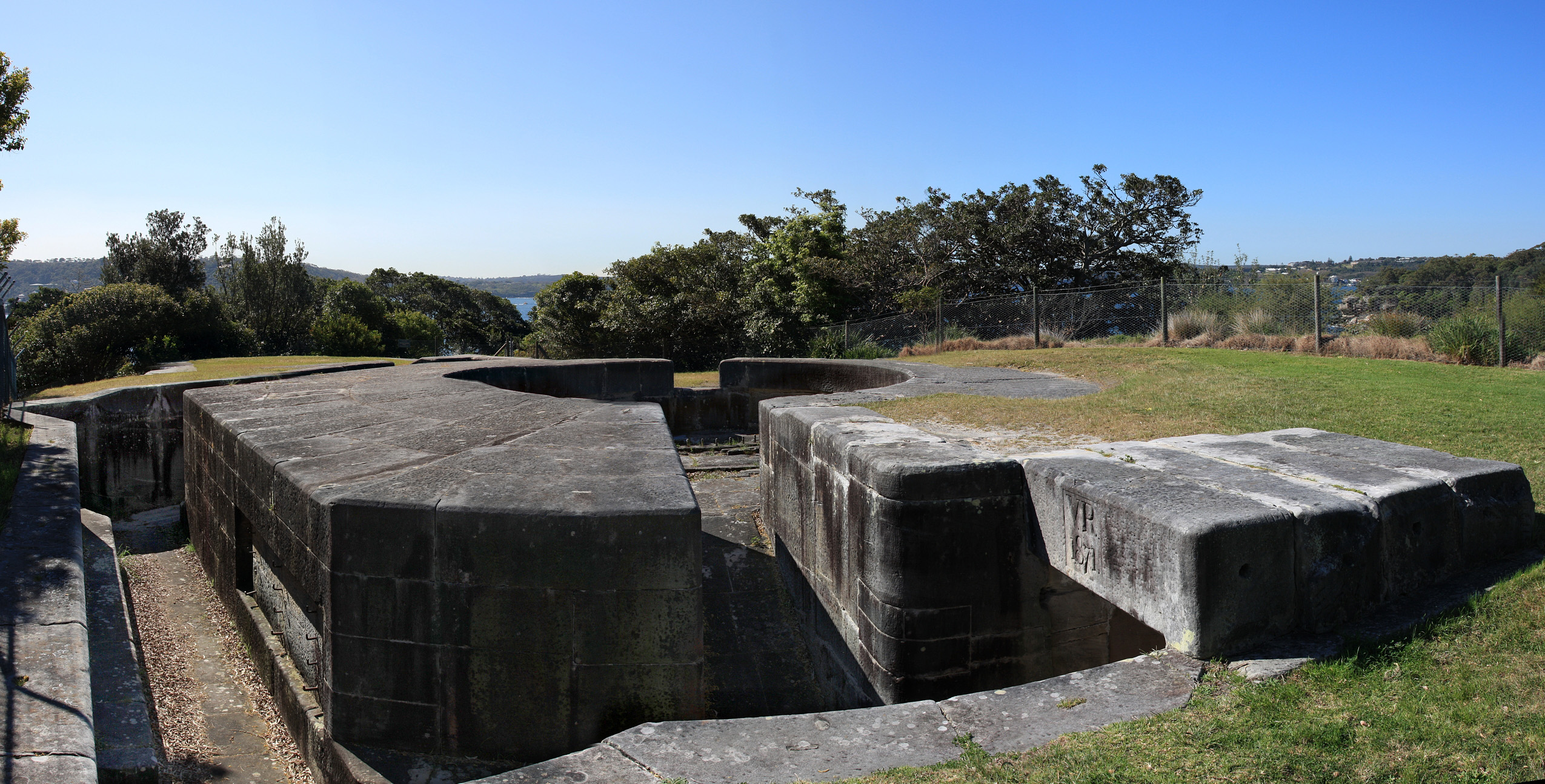
- The main gun emplacement with the RAN degaussing station in view

Site information
- Open to the public: yes

Location
- Location within inner Sydney
- Coordinates: 33°51′04″S 151°15′54″E

Site history
- Built: 1871–1874

The Steele Point Battery is a small fort, on the shores of Port Jackson in the eastern Sydney suburb of Vaucluse, Australia.

== History ==
Talk of the need for harbour defences was noted as far back as 1857, while referencing the alternate name of Steel Point.

The land on Shark Point was resumed from its private owners and construction of the battery began in 1871 and was completed in 1874 with an additional barracks being added in 1880. The site was designed under the supervision of colonial architect James Barnet who was responsible for designing several other harbour fortifications during this period. In 1872 three 80-pounder rifled muzzle-loading guns were installed.

It has been stated that the Shark Point battery was upgraded in 1893 to hold a BL 9.2 inch (234 mm) Mk VI breech-loading 'counter bombardment' British Armstrong 'disappearing' gun. This is incorrect, as there were two different 'Shark Point' batteries. The Shark Point Battery with the 9.2in Hydro-Pneumatic gun mounting as actually at Shark Point, Little Coogee. Three such batteries protected Port Jackson and the city from bombardment from the sea. The other two are the Ben Buckler Gun Battery at Ben Buckler, and the Signal Hill Battery at Watsons Bay. The design of the batteries included a domed metal shield that covered each gun pit was intended to protect the gun from incoming shells. The Clovelly Shark Point Battery's 9.2 inch gun's serial number was 7317.

At some point the Vaucluse Shark Point was rearmed with three 5-inch breech-loading guns.

The Shark Point battery formed part of the Sydney Harbour defences and was originally built at a time of fears of a Russian attack and other concerns such as in the withdrawal of British garrison troops, threats to British dependencies and increasing self-reliance in defence matters. The fort worked in conjunction with various other forts located on Sydney Harbour that were also built in or around 1871. These forts included, the Middle Head Fortifications, the Georges Head Battery, the Lower Georges Heights Commanding Position and another small fort on Bradleys Head, known as the 'Bradleys Head Fortification Complex'.

The original form was for two 68-pounder guns with further guns placed at the other South Head site.

In its last form, the battery consisted of three sandstone gun emplacements or pits with embrasures for the guns to fire through. These pits were connected by open passages and covered passages that led into underground chambers that consisted of a gunpowder magazine, a shell and artillery store and two shell and lamp recesses built of stone. The site had its own living quarters that included amenities for the workers manning the fort. The fort was surrounded by a picket fence with a sandstone base and another barbed wire fence for security. The fort also had its own jetty with connecting roads.

Steele Point at present consists of a three-gun battery. The passageways, tunnels, magazine store and barrack room are now partially buried. The stone lintel cover of the entry to the rear emplacement was smashed and the tunnel filled with debris, allowing water to seep in causing damage to the interior. The stonework of the lower emplacements and connecting passages are in good condition and there is still one gun emplacement located above ground.

The land on which the fort is located was granted to the state of New South Wales in 1980 and later became the responsibility of the NSW National Parks & Wildlife Service. A small portion of the land on which the fort is located is used as a degaussing station by the Royal Australian Navy. The larger area is Heritage Listed as Nielsen Park.

Steel Point was renamed to Steele Point in 1993.

== See also ==
- Military history of Australia
