= Dobrinja =

Neighborhood in Sarajevo, Bosnia and Herzegovina

Dobrinja Добриња
- Neighborhood
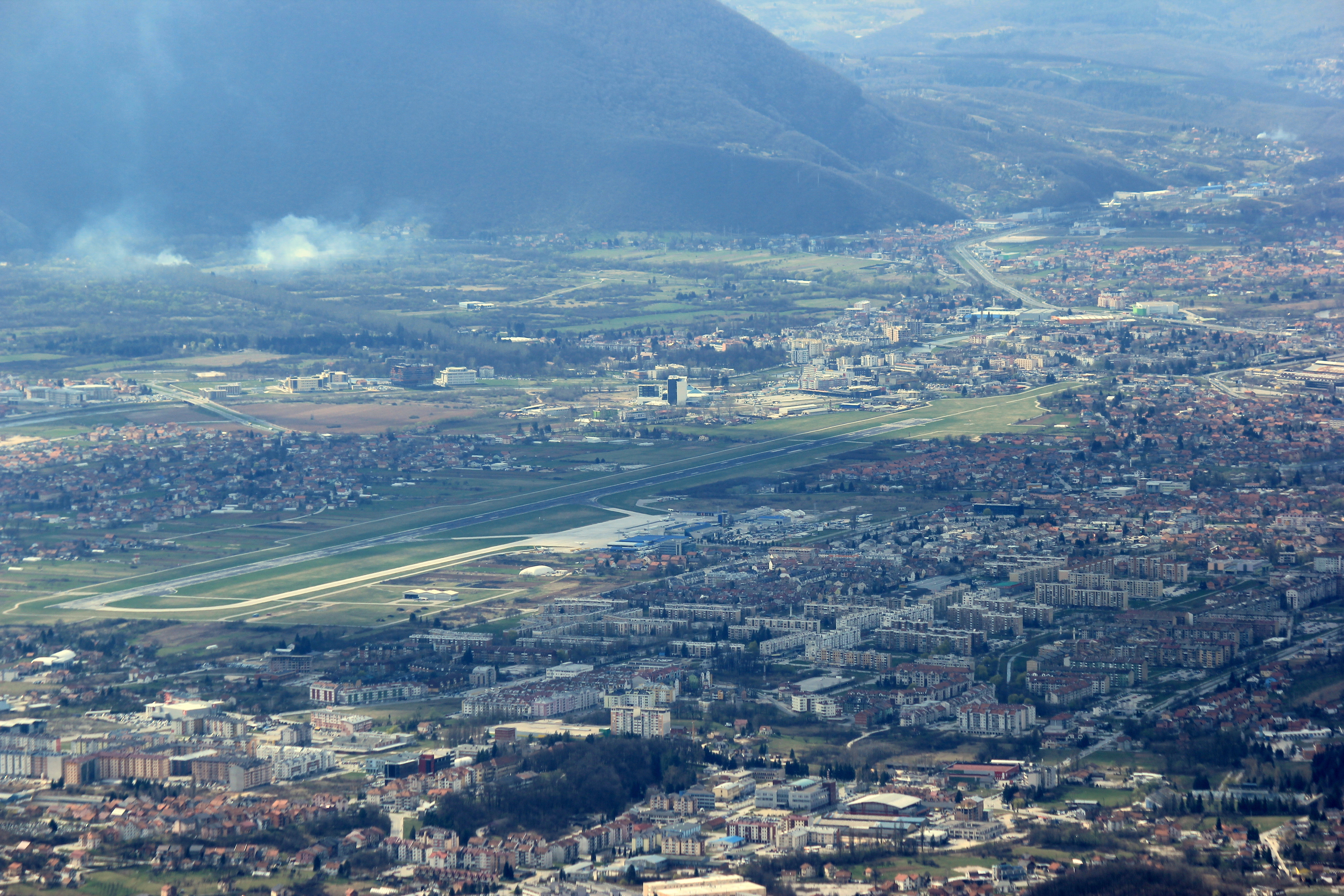
- Dobrinja and Sarajevo International Airport as seen from Mount Trebević

- Location within Bosnia and Herzegovina
- Coordinates: 43°49′41″N 18°20′49″E
- Country: Bosnia and Herzegovina
- Entity: Federation of Bosnia and Herzegovina
- Canton: Sarajevo Canton
- City: Sarajevo
- Municipality: Novi Grad
- Time zone: UTC+1 (CET)
  - Summer (DST): UTC+2 (CEST)

Dobrinja (Serbian Cyrillic: Добриња) is a neighbourhood in the western outskirts of Sarajevo, part of the municipality of Novi Grad. It is estimated to have a population of 25,063 inhabitants. Its name comes from the short river Dobrinja that flows through it. It is today organised in four local communities (MZ Dobrinja A, B, C, and D). Dobrinja lies just north of Sarajevo International Airport.

The first phase of settlement construction was completed in 1983 with the settlement areas of Dobrinja I and Dobrinja II, used as Olympic Villages for the accommodation of sportspeople and foreign journalists in Sarajevo for the 1984 Winter Olympics. They included two residential neighbourhood, one school, and a trolleybus line to link it with the city centre. Dobrinja III, with its primary school, was the next phase in the second half of the 1980s. By the early 1990s Dobrinja IV and V were built and occupied. The newest blocks. These newest settlements suffered most damage during the conflict, as they were repeatedly bombed by the Army of Republika Srpska, and all three schools were destroyed. Overall, during the Siege of Sarajevo (1992–95), Dobrinja was the most bombed neighbourhood of Sarajevo. In 1993 a mortar attack was conducted from Serb-held positions on a football game. 13 people died and over 130 were wounded.

Most of Dobrinja lies west of the inter-entity boundary line, in the territory of Sarajevo Canton. Only its eastern parts (Dobrinja IV, Soko and parts of Dobrinja I) are in the territory of Republika Srpska, in the municipality of Istočna Ilidža, where the main bus station for Istočno Sarajevo is located.

The inter-entity boundary line posed certain problems in the case of Dobrinja, as it passed through apartment buildings and individual apartments. The residents were often confused about where to get the utilities such as electricity or water, or postal services. In response, some efforts were made to revise the boundary line through Dobrinja, but the communities involved failed to reach an agreement. By year 2001, the international High Representative appointed a former Irish Circuit Court judge Diarmuid Sheridan as an independent arbitrator, who re-drew the revised inter-entity boundary line, affecting Dobrinja I and IV, and eliminated the most pressing problems.

Dobrinja hosts today four primary schools, named after Skender Kulenović, Ćamil Sijarić, Osman Nuri Hadžić, and two secondary schools, the Dobrinja Gymnasium (Gimnnazija Dobrinja) and the Sarajevo Fifth High School (Peta gimnazija).

== Gallery ==
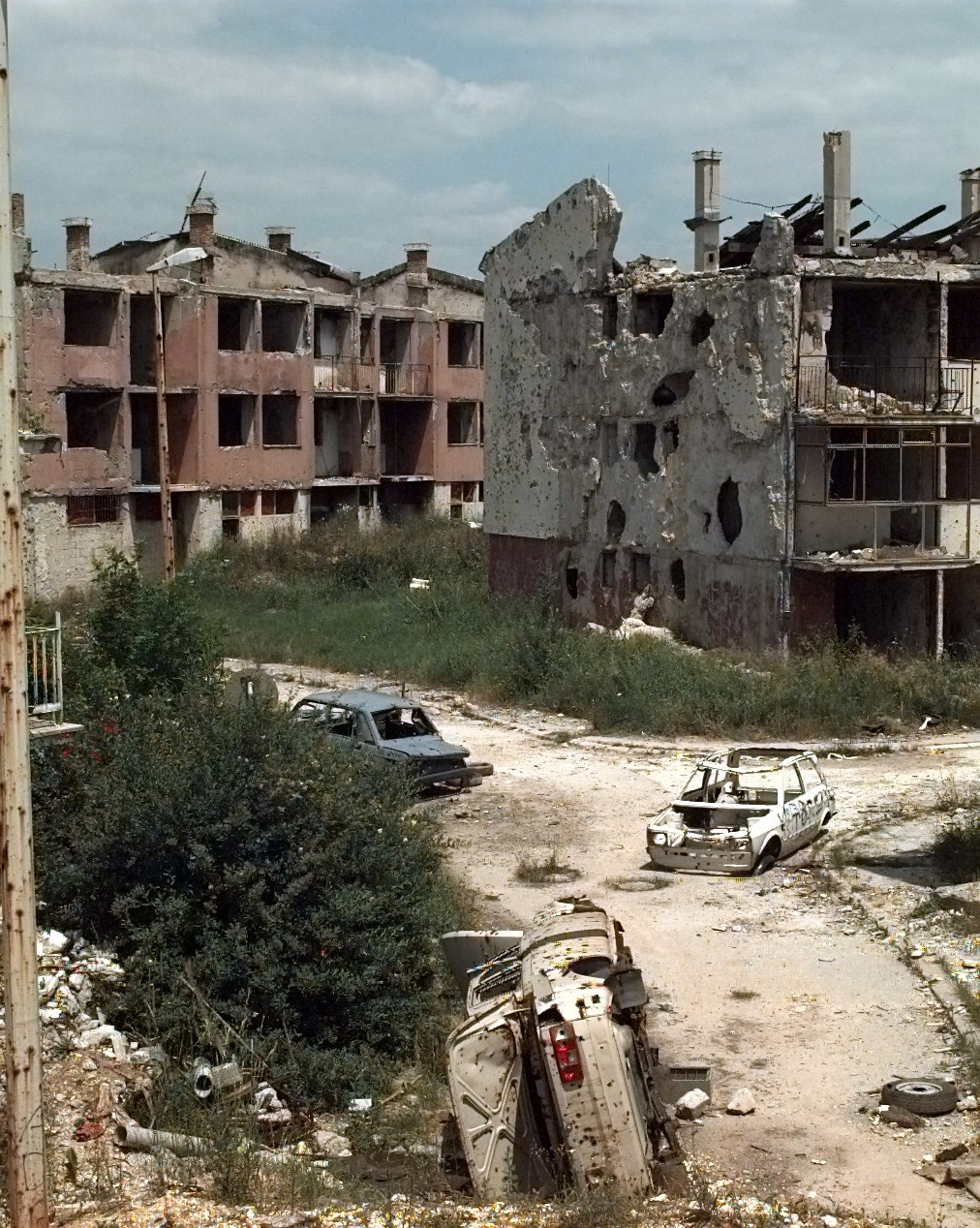
Dobrinja in 1996.

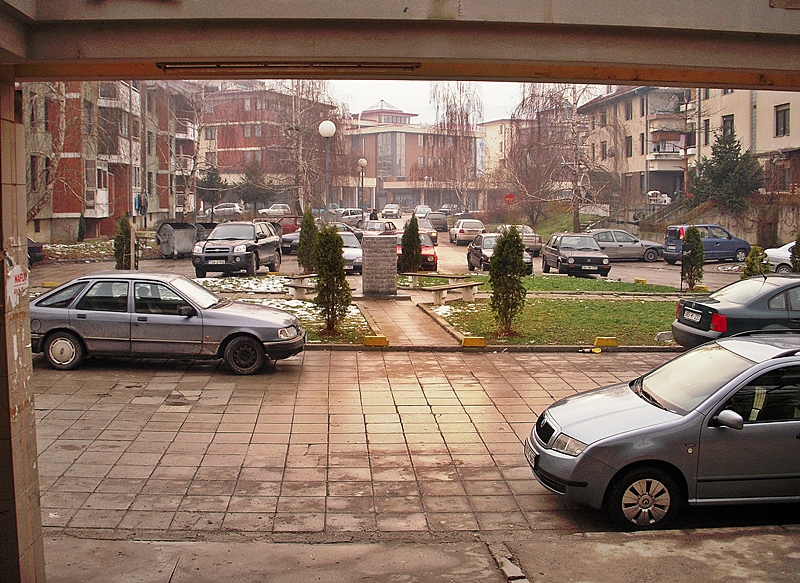
Residential court in Dobrinja in 2012.

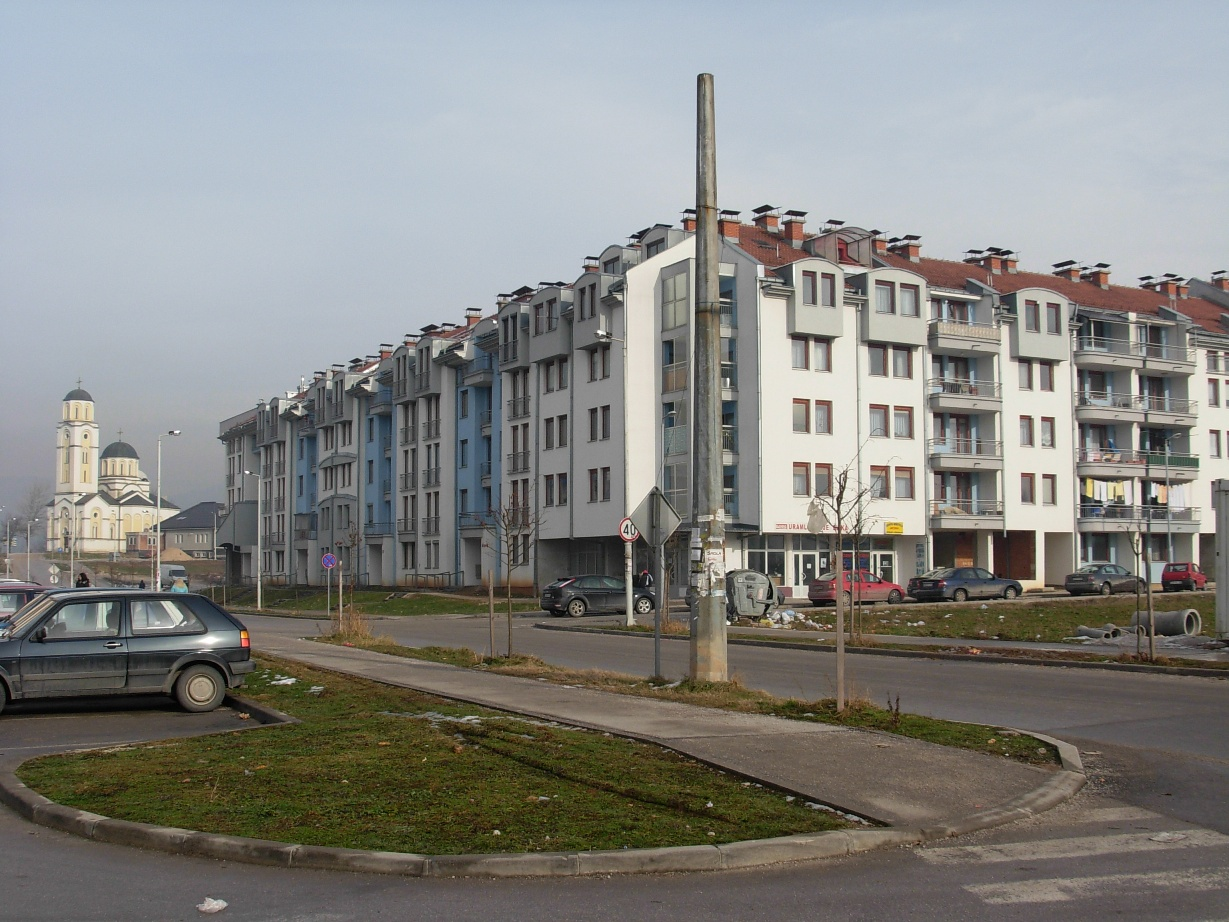
New residential blocks in Dobrinja and the Church of St. Basil of Ostrog.

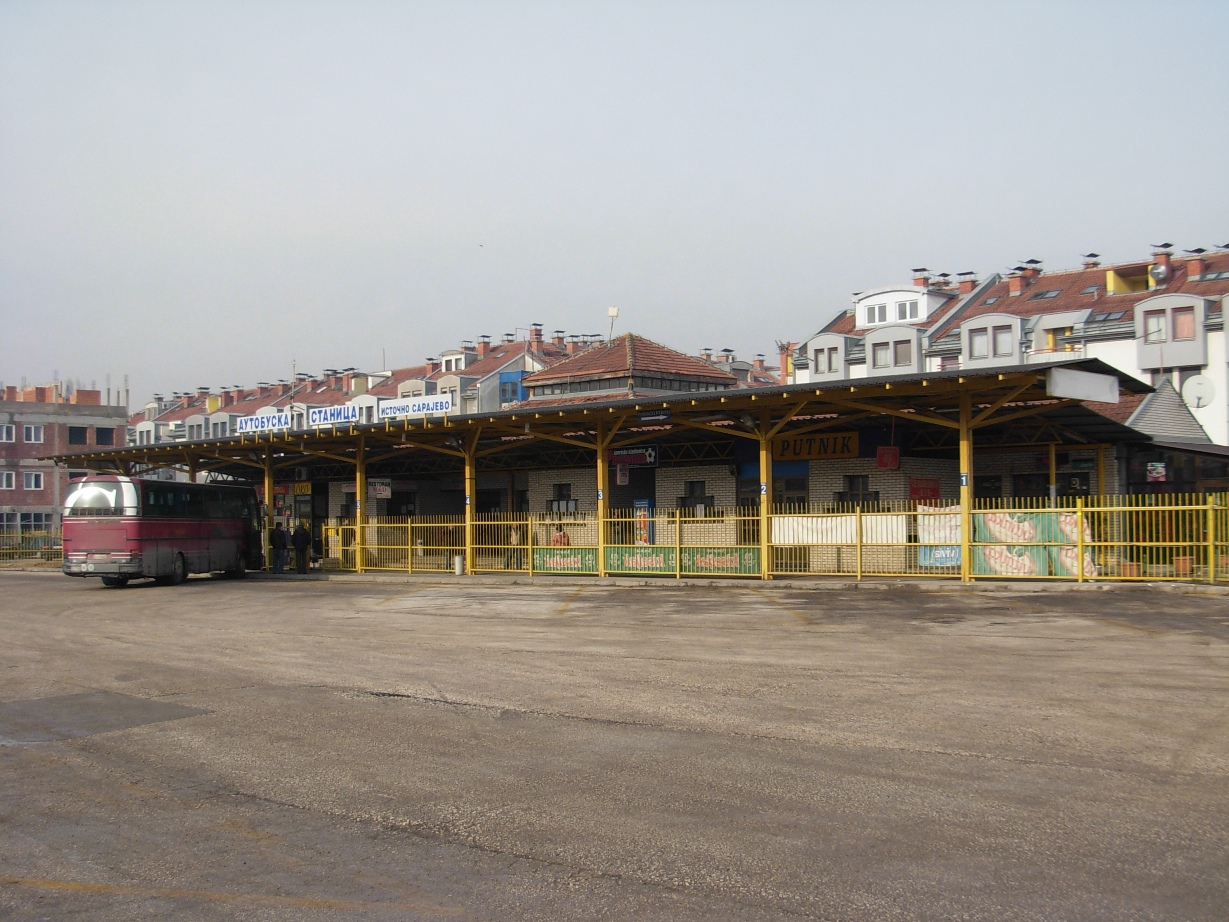
Istočno Sarajevo bus station.

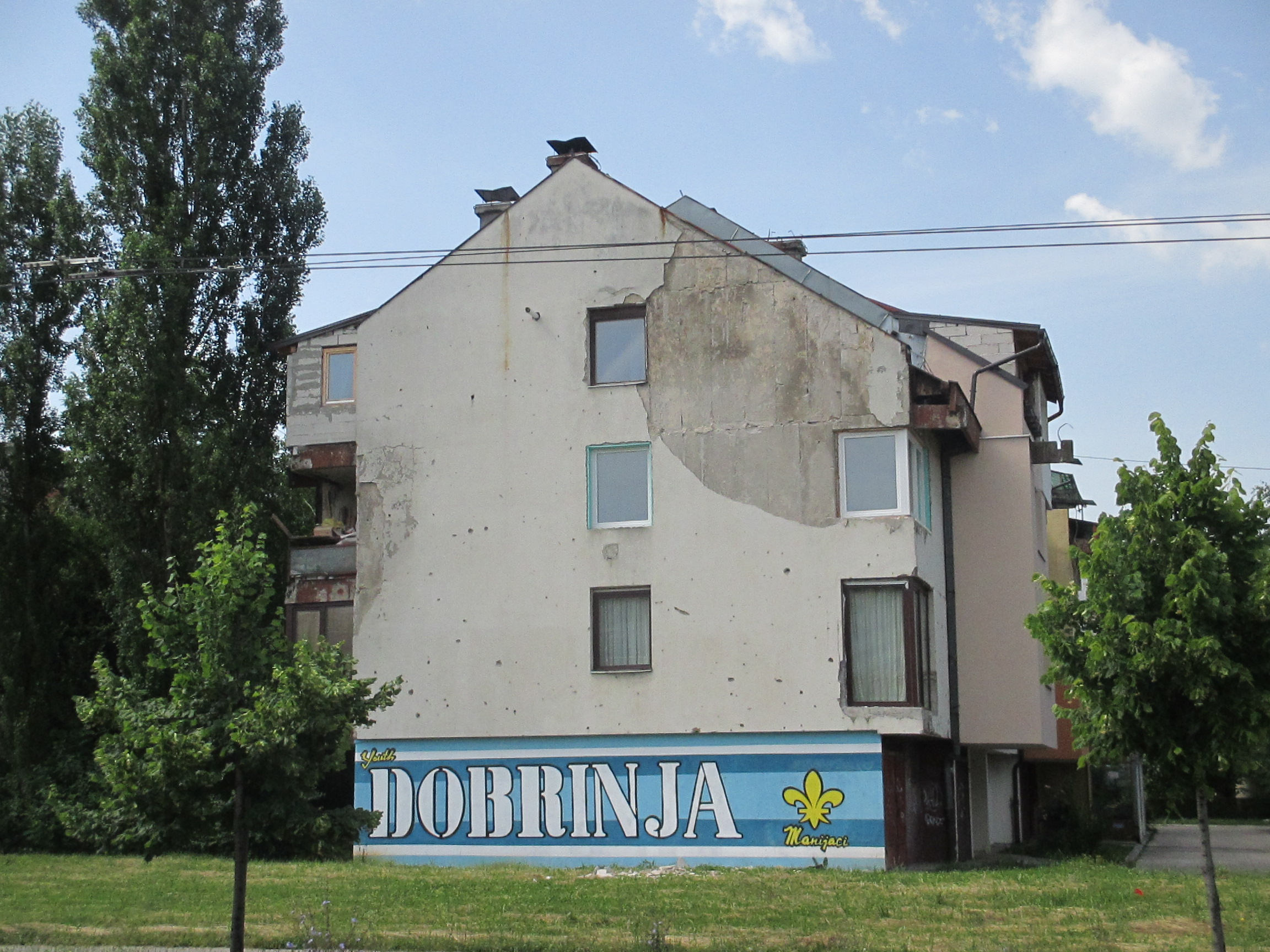
Mural painting (Mimara Sinana Boulevard), by the Manijaci football fan group, June 2014.
