= Prinassos =

Prinassos (Ancient Greek: Πρινασσός) was a Rhodian fortified city in Caria, it belonged to the Rhodian Peraia. Today is unlocated.

Philip V of Macedon besieged the city at 201 BC and at the end the citizens of Prinassos decided to surrender.
