= Lower Georges Heights Commanding Position =

Coordinates: 33°50′08″S 151°15′29″E

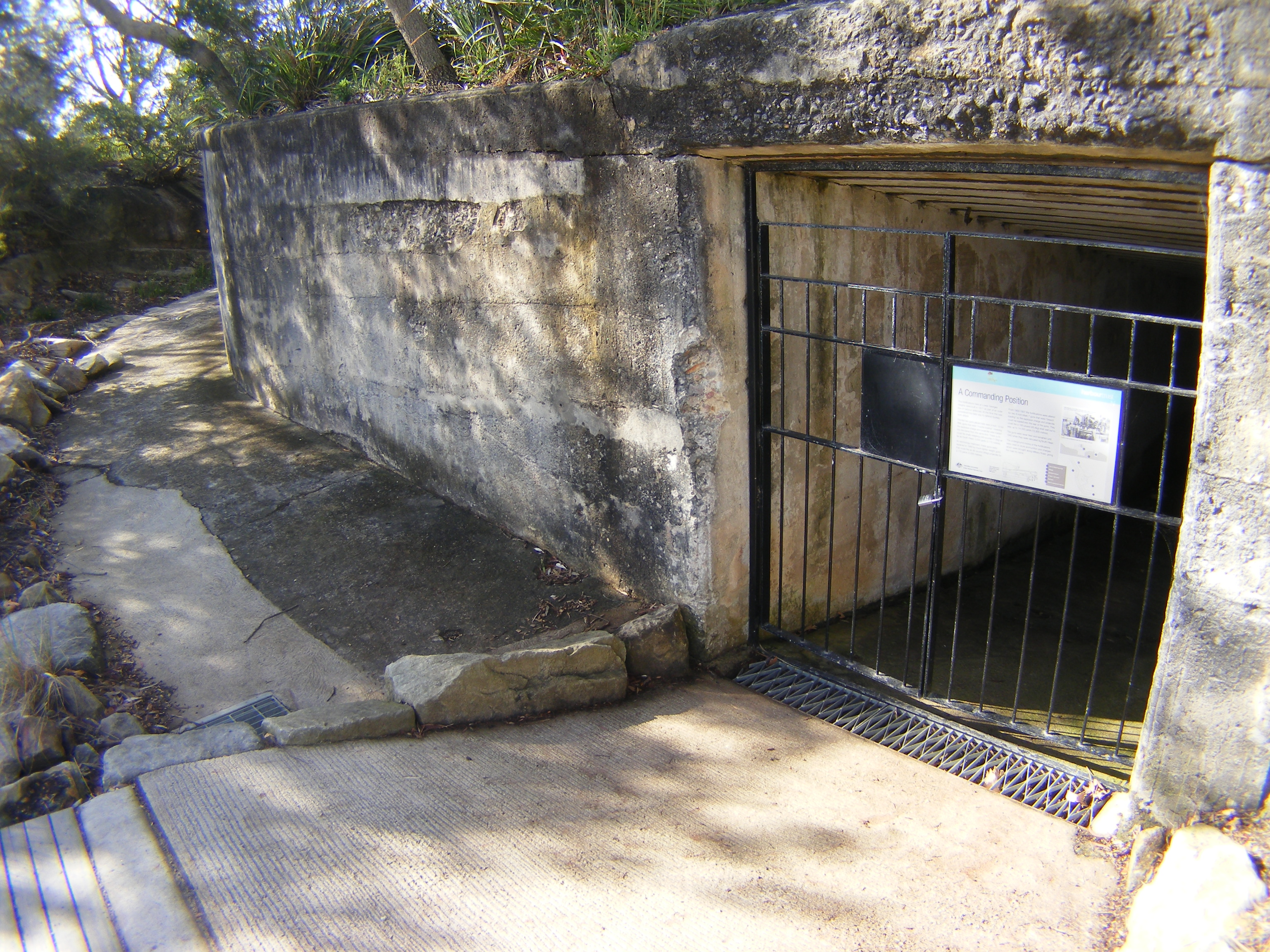
The main entrance to the fortification command position at Georges Heights

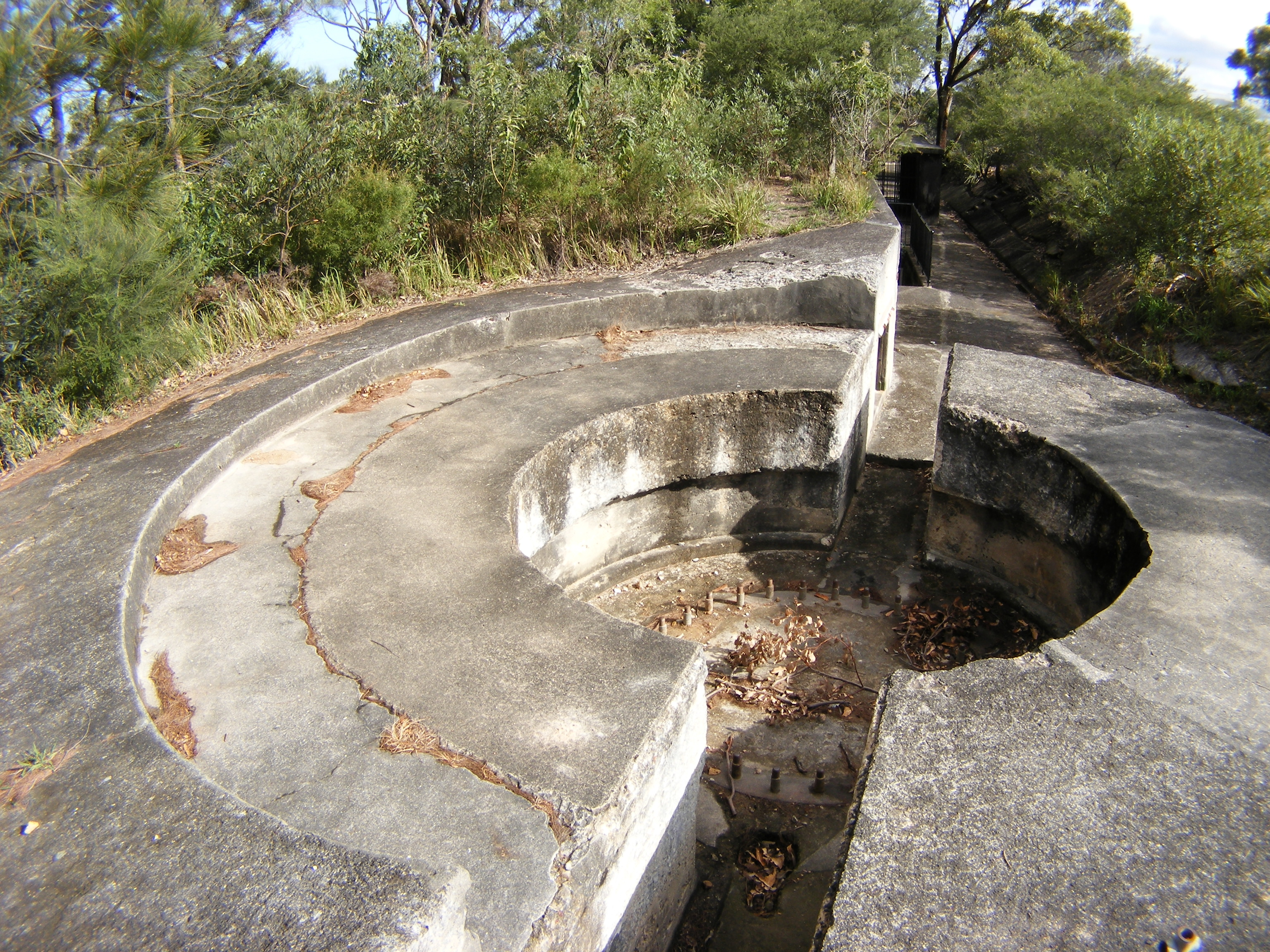
Gun emplacements on site

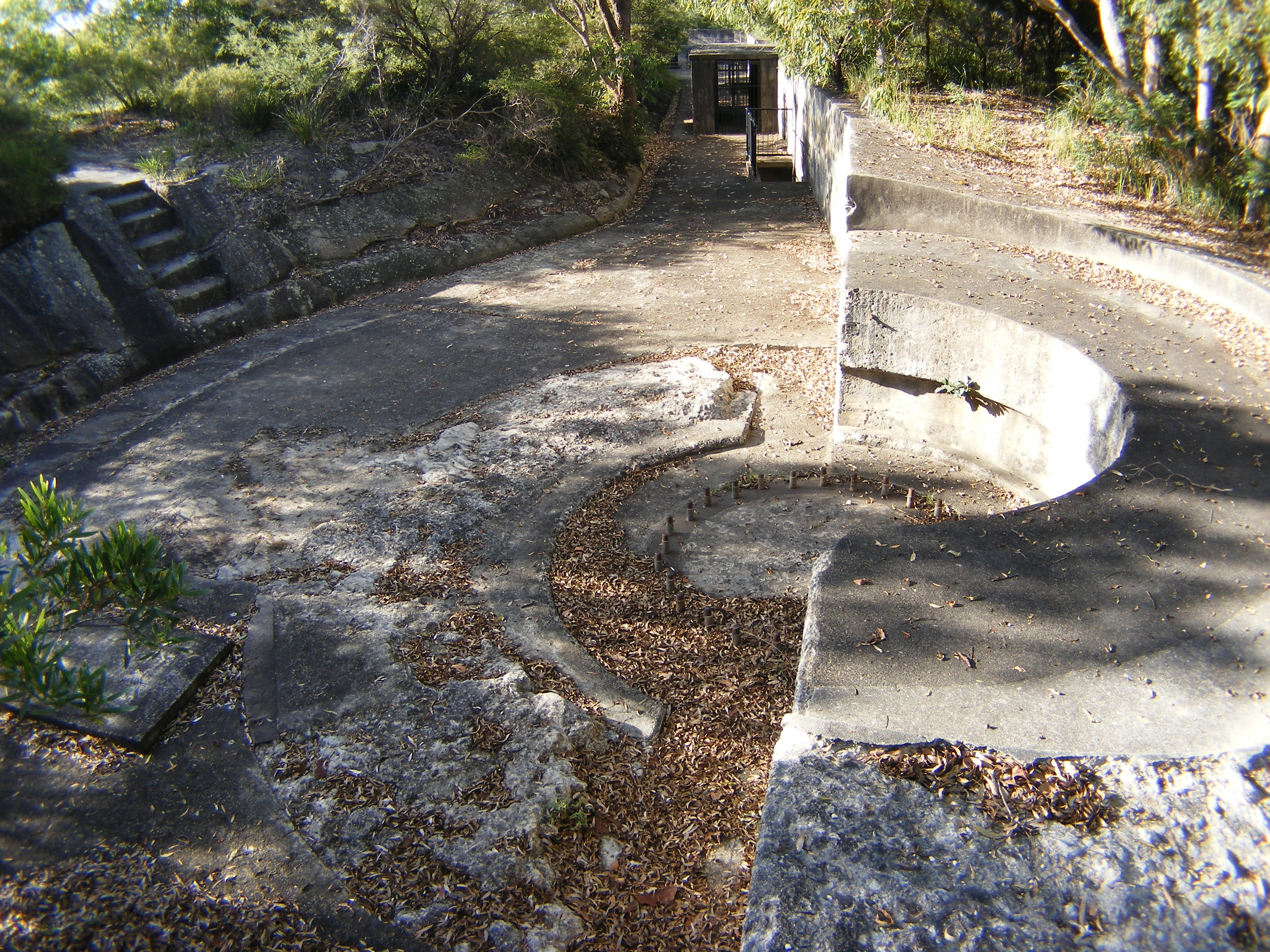

The Lower Georges Heights Commanding Position is located in the urban locality of Georges Heights in the suburb of Mosman, on the shores of Port Jackson, Sydney, New South Wales, Australia. The Lower Georges Heights Commanding Position was constructed and designed to stop enemy ships from entering into Sydney Harbour, and worked in conjunction with several others forts located within close proximity.

== History ==
The fortification was built in 1877 and became part of the Sydney Harbours outer defences. At the time this method of fortification was considered to be the most efficient way of defending this entry point into Sydney Harbour.

The two cannons that were first placed at the site were RML 9 inch 12 ton guns. Rifled Muzzle Loaders (RMLs) are artillery pieces loaded from the muzzle, but with a rifled bore liner, invented in the mid-19th century. In contrast to smooth bore cannon which preceded it, the rifling of the gun barrel allowed much greater accuracy and penetration as the spin induced to the shell gave it directional stability. Initially smooth-bore cannon were converted into rifles by re-boring and lining; but later new guns were manufactured from scratch as RMLs. The RML 9 inch 12 ton gun could discharge shells weighing 249 pounds (113 kg) as far as South Head (Watsons Bay); approximately 3,000 yards (2,770 metres).

As technology improved, these cannons were replaced in 1889 by much lighter weight guns that could fire an 80-pound (36 kg) projectile for 3,170 yards (3,000 metres).

From 1903 to 1907 the fortifications were upgraded to allow for the installation of two BL 6 inch Mark 7 guns that were “breech loading” which meant that the explosive charge and projectile were to be loaded into the rear of the cannon. They could fire a 100-pound (45.4 kg) shell a long way out to sea; up to 14,000 yards (12,900 metres).

The underground rooms of the fortifications were used to store ammunition and charges which were brought along Military Road, giving the road its name.

== Gallery ==
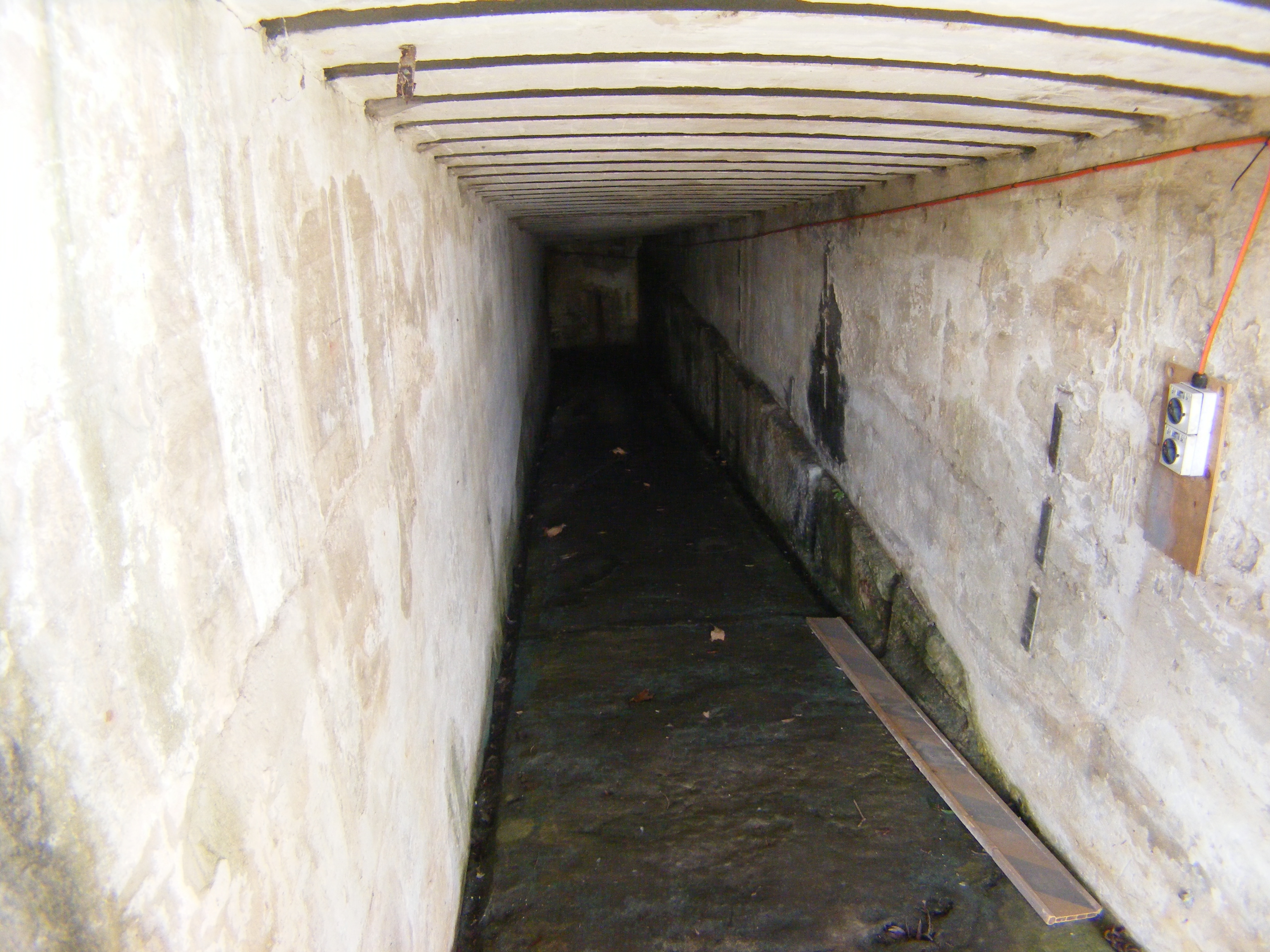
Main tunnel as seen from the main gate

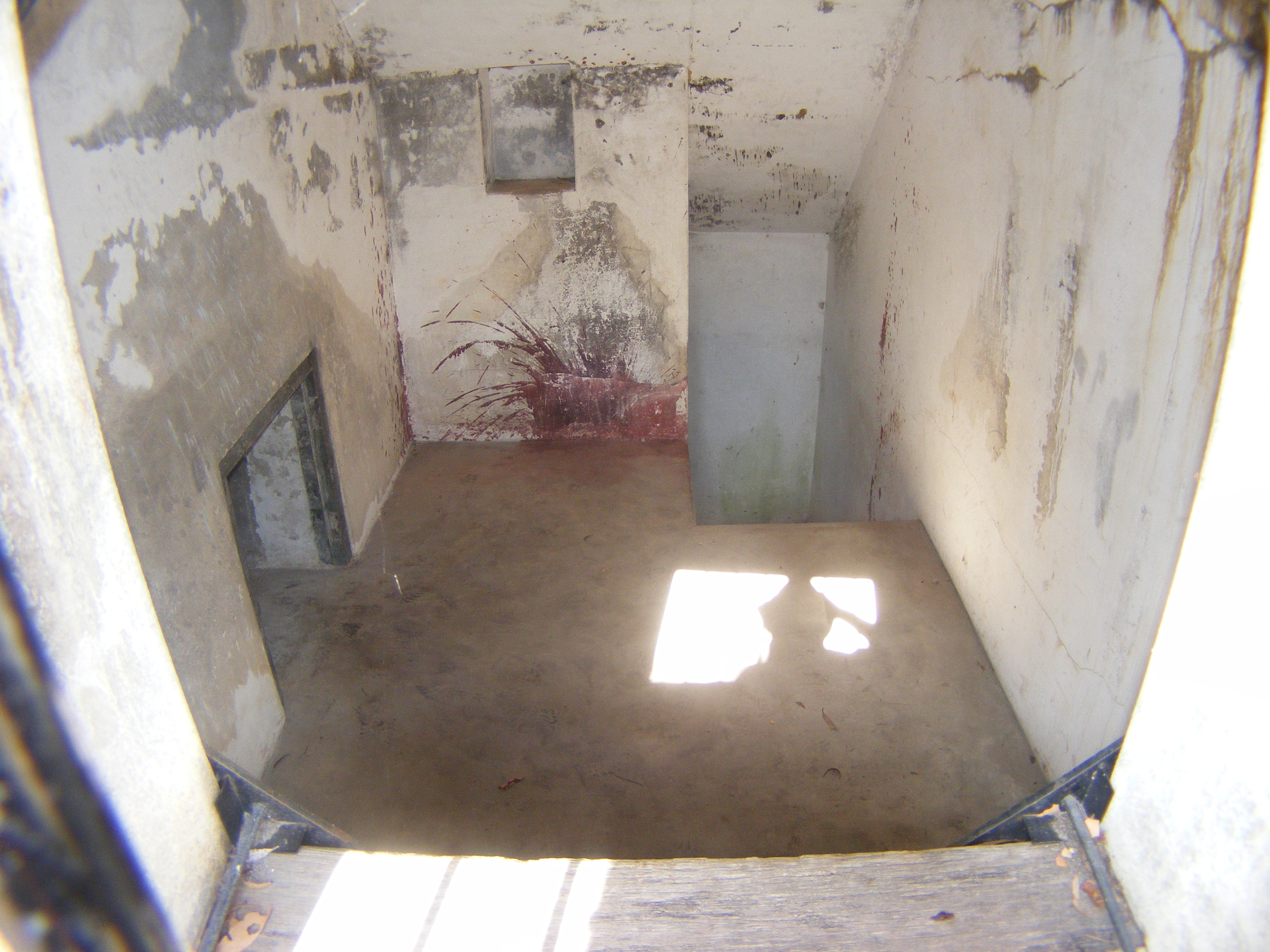
One of the rooms inside the fort.

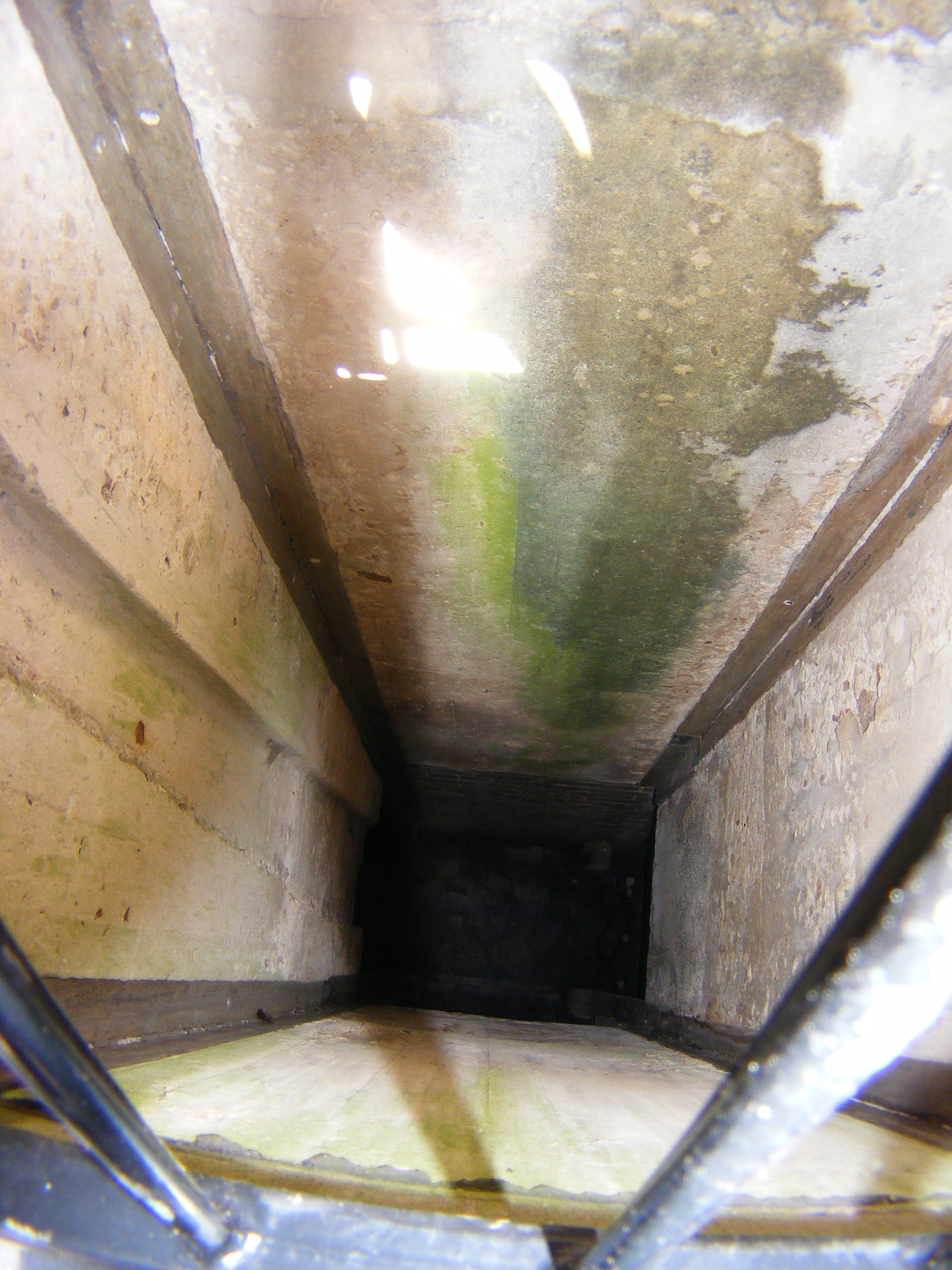
A shaft that leads down into the forts tunnel system.
