= Y Sap mine =

WWI underground explosive charge

- Part of The Battle of the Somme, First World War
- Battle of the Somme 1 July – 18 November 1916
Date	1 July 1916
Location	Picardy, France 50°01′14.5″N 02°41′24.1″E
Result	German victory

Belligerents
Britain	Germany

Commanders and leaders
Douglas Haig	Erich von Falkenhayn
- Site of the Y Sap mine, near La Boisselle

The Y Sap mine was an underground explosive charge, secretly planted by the British during the First World War and ready for 1 July 1916, the first day on the Somme. The mine was dug by the Tunnelling Companies of the Royal Engineers under a German machine-gun nest known as Blinddarm (appendix) in the front line, on the north side of the village of La Boisselle in the Somme département. The mine was named after Y Sap, the British trench from which the gallery was driven. It was one of 19 mines on the British sector to be blown at the start of the battle.

Y Sap mine was sprung at 7:28 a.m. on 1 July 1916 and left a large crater. The explosion of the Y Sap mine failed to assist the British attack as the German eavesdroppers at the Moritz 28 Nord listening station intercepted and passed on the British "good luck" message. The Germans removed machine-guns from the Blinddarm and at Zero Hour the machine-gunners caught the British infantry in crossfire. The 34th Division had the highest number of casualties of any of the divisions involved on 1 July. The crater of the Y Sap mine was filled in after World War I (in 1974) and is no longer visible.

== Background ==
=== 1914 ===
French and German military operations began on the Somme in September 1914. A German advance westwards towards Albert was stopped by the French at La Boisselle and attempts to resume mobile warfare in October failed. Both sides reduced their attacks to local operations or raids and began to fortify their remaining positions with underground works. On 18 December, the French captured the La Boisselle village cemetery at the west end of a German salient and established an advanced post only 9.8 ft (3 m) from the German front line. By 24 December, the French had forced the Germans back from the cemetery and the western area of La Boisselle but were stopped a short distance forward at L'îlot de La Boisselle, in front of German trenches protected by barbed wire. Once the location of a farm and a small number of buildings, L'îlot became known as Granathof (Shell Farm) to the Germans and later as the Glory Hole to the British. On Christmas Day 1914, French engineers sank the first mine shaft at La Boisselle.

=== 1915 ===
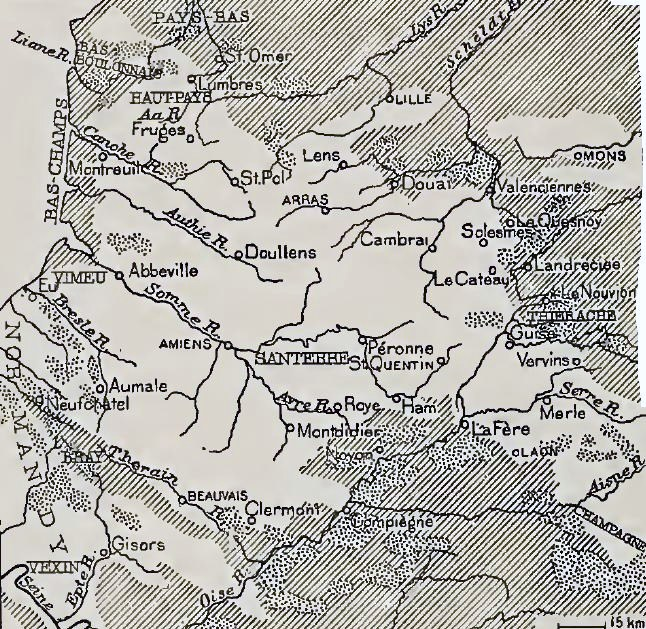
Map of chalk areas in northern France

Fighting continued in no man's land at the west end of La Boisselle, where the opposing lines were 200 yd (180 m) apart, even during lulls along the rest of the Somme front. On the night of 8/9 March, a German sapper inadvertently broke into French mine gallery, which he found to have been charged with explosives; a group of volunteers took 45 minutes to dismantle the charge and cut the firing cables. From April 1915 – January 1916, 61 mines were sprung around L'îlot, some loaded with 20–25 long tons; 44,000–55,000 lb (20,000–25,000 kg) of explosives. At the end of July 1915, fresh troops were observed moving into the French positions north of the Somme and on 1 August, they were identified at Thiepval Wood as British soldiers ("dressed in brown suits").

The British had formed the 178th and 179th Tunnelling companies in August, followed by the 185th and 252nd Tunnelling companies in October. Brigadier-General George Fowke the Engineer-in-Chief of the BEF, moved the 174th and 183rd Tunnelling Companies into the area but at first the British did not have enough miners to take over the large number of French shafts; the problem was temporarily solved when the French agreed to leave their engineers behind for several weeks. On 24 July, the 174th Tunnelling Company established headquarters at Bray, taking over some 66 shafts at Carnoy, Fricourt, Maricourt and La Boisselle. No man's land just south-west of La Boisselle was very narrow, at one point about 50 yd (46 m) wide, and had become pockmarked by many chalk craters. Elaborate precautions were taken to preserve secrecy, since no continuous front line trench ran through the area opposite the west end of La Boisselle and the British front line. L'îlot was defended by posts near the mine shafts.

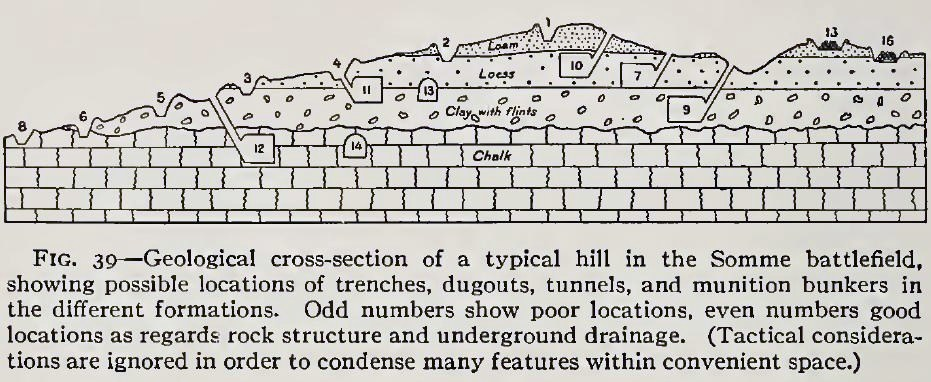
Geological cross-section of the Somme battlefield

The underground war continued with offensive mining to destroy opposing strong points and defensive mining to destroy tunnels, which were 30–120 ft (9.1–36.6 m) long. Around La Boisselle, the Germans dug defensive transverse tunnels about 80 ft (24 m) long, parallel to the front line. On 19 November 1915, the 179th Tunnelling Company commander, Captain Henry Hance, estimated that the Germans were 15 yd (14 m) away and ordered the mine chamber to be loaded with 6,000 lb (2.7 long tons; 2.7 t) of explosives, which was completed by midnight on 20/21 November. At 1:30 a.m. the Germans blew the charge, filling the remaining British tunnels with carbon monoxide. The right and left tunnels collapsed; it was later found that the German explosion had detonated the British mine. (Note: The wrecked tunnels were gradually re-opened but about thirty bodies remained beneath La Boisselle.)

== Prelude ==
=== 1916 ===
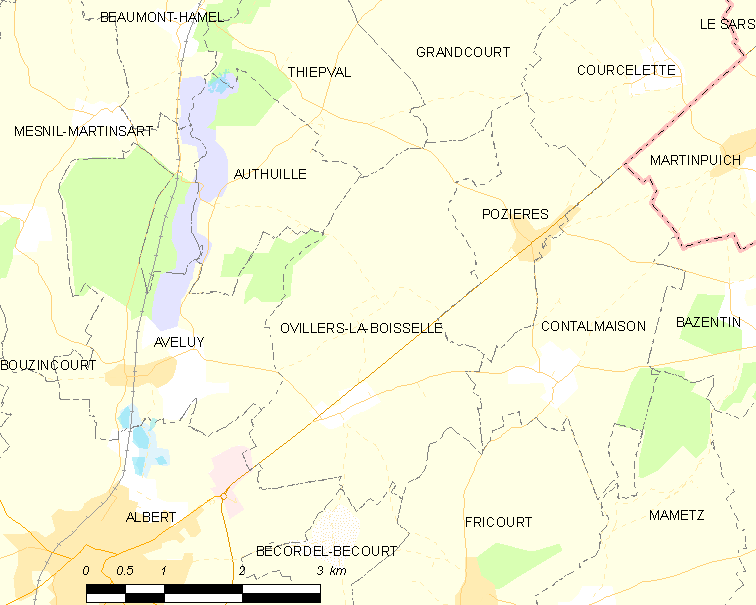
Map of the vicinity of Ovillers-La Boisselle (commune FR insee code 80615)

At the start of the Battle of Albert (1–13 July), the name given by the British to the first two weeks of the Battle of the Somme, La Boisselle stood on the centre of the British attack. The tunnelling companies were to help the Allied preparations for the battle by placing 19 mines of various sizes under the German positions along the front line and by preparing a series of shallow Russian saps from the British front line into no man's land, which would be opened at Zero Hour to allow the infantry to attack the German positions from a much shorter distance. At La Boisselle, four mines were prepared by the Royal Engineers, two charges (No 2 straight and No 5 right) were planted at L'îlot at the end of galleries dug from Inch Street Trench by the 179th Tunnelling Company, intended to wreck German tunnels and create crater lips to block enfilade fire along no man's land. As the Germans in La Boisselle had fortified the cellars of ruined houses and the cratered ground made a direct infantry assault on the village impossible, two further mines, known as Y Sap, the British name for the German Blinddarm strongpoint and Lochnagar after the trench from which the gallery was dug, were planted to the north-east and the south-east of La Boisselle to assist the attack on either side of the German salient in the village.

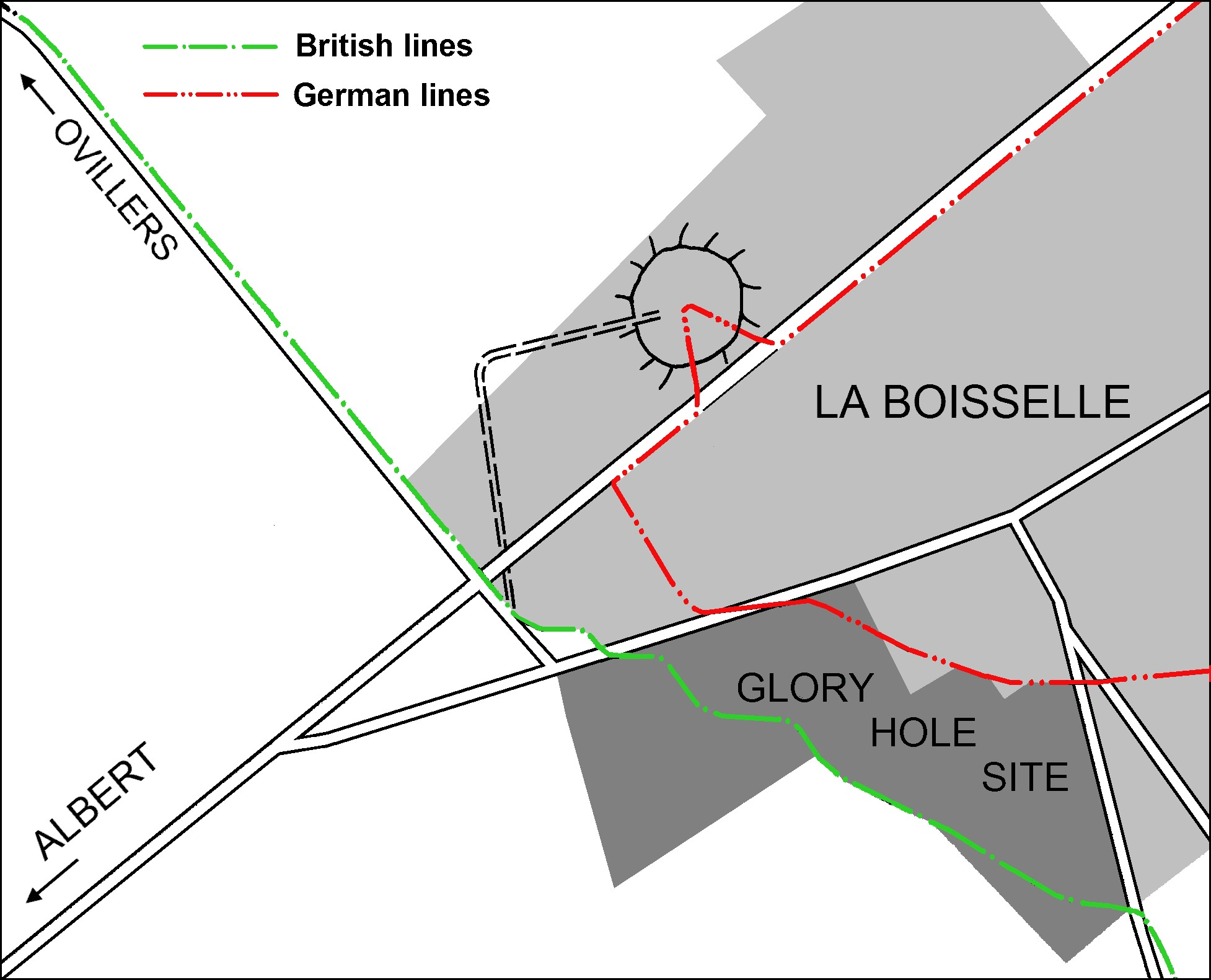
Plan of the Y Sap mine. The Glory Hole site was known as Granathof to the Germans and as L'îlot de La Boisselle to the French.

In January and February 1916, British raiding parties had discovered that the Blinddarm strongpoint (Y Sap to the British) was protected by a system of deep mines. Y Sap mine was dug underneath the Blinddarm strongpoint, which overlooked Mash Valley, just north of La Boisselle. The mine consisted of a gallery dug from the British front line, near where it crossed the D 929 Albert–Bapaume road to a mine chamber under the Blinddarm. Because the Germans had built tunnels 30–120 ft (9.1–36.6 m) deep and transverse defensive galleries 80 ft (24 m) deep and parallel to the German front line, the gallery could not be dug in a straight line. The gallery was dug about 500 yd (460 m) into no man's land, then doglegged to the right for about another 500 yd (460 m). About 40,000 lb (18 long tons; 18 t) of ammonal was placed in the chamber under Y Sap (the Blinddarm).

To keep quiet, the tunnellers used bayonets with spliced handles and worked barefoot on a floor covered with sandbags. Flints were carefully prised out of the chalk and laid on the floor; if the bayonet was manipulated two-handed, an assistant caught the dislodged material. Spoil was placed in sandbags, passed hand-to-hand along a row of miners sitting on the floor and stored along the side of the tunnel, later to be used to tamp the charge. Lochnagar and Y Sap mines were overcharged to ensure that large rims were formed from the disturbed ground and communication tunnels were also dug for use immediately after the first attack. The mines were laid without interference by German miners but while the ammonal was being placed, German troops of the 9th Company, RIR 110 could hear the British miners but not where they were; German miners could be heard by the British miners below Lochnagar and above Y Sap mine.

Captain Henry Hance, commander of the 179th Tunnelling Company, doubted the effect of the British destructive artillery bombardment and recommended blowing Y Sap mine two days early, to destroy the Blinddarm and prevent enfilade fire from it during the British attack. The crater could be occupied by the British infantry and used by the Royal Engineers to dig an advanced jumping-off trench for the British infantry, which would reduce the distance the British infantry would have to cross by over 490 ft (150 m). Hance's superiors agreed that firing Y Sap mine early could help to neutralise enemy fire from the flanks around La Boisselle but the explosion would alert the Germans that a British attack was imminent and the suggestion was rejected.

== Battle ==
=== 1 July ===
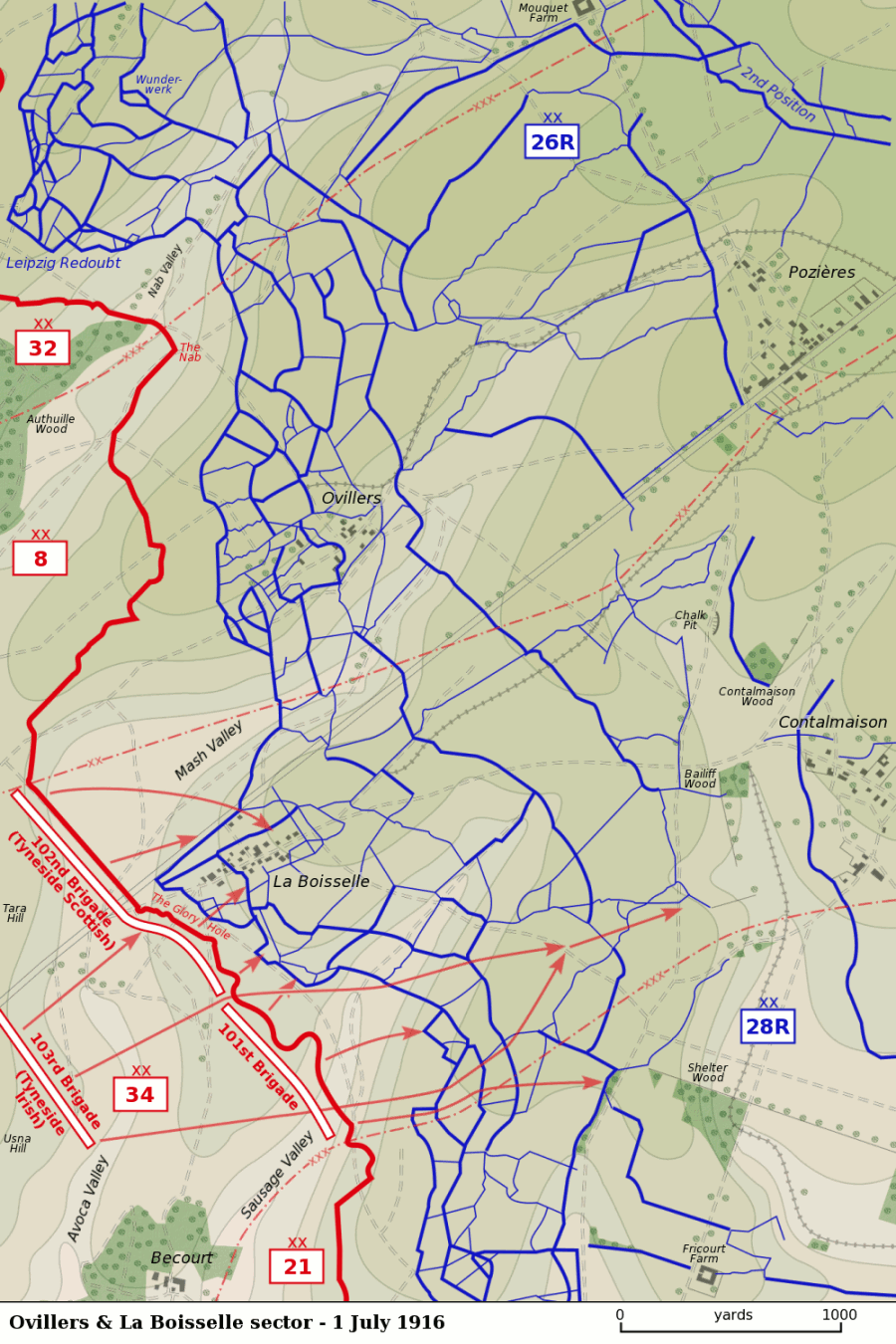
34th Division attack at La Boisselle, 1 July 1916

The four mines at La Boisselle were detonated at 7:28 a.m. on 1 July 1916, the first day on the Somme. Y Sap and Lochnagar mines were the largest mines ever detonated. The blast was the largest man-made sound in history and some reports said that it could be heard from London. The explosion of Y Sap mine left a large crater but failed to assist the British attack at Zero Hour as the Germans had detected the mine in time, evacuated the position and caught the British infantry in crossfire, particularly the troops of the 102nd (Tyneside Scottish) Brigade (Brigadier-General Trevor Tiernan), on the left flank of the 34th Division. The brigade suffered the worst losses of any brigade on the first day on the Somme, many of the casualties occurring behind the British front-line. Losses in the brigade on 1 July were so severe that on 6 July, the brigade was swapped with a brigade of the 37th Division.

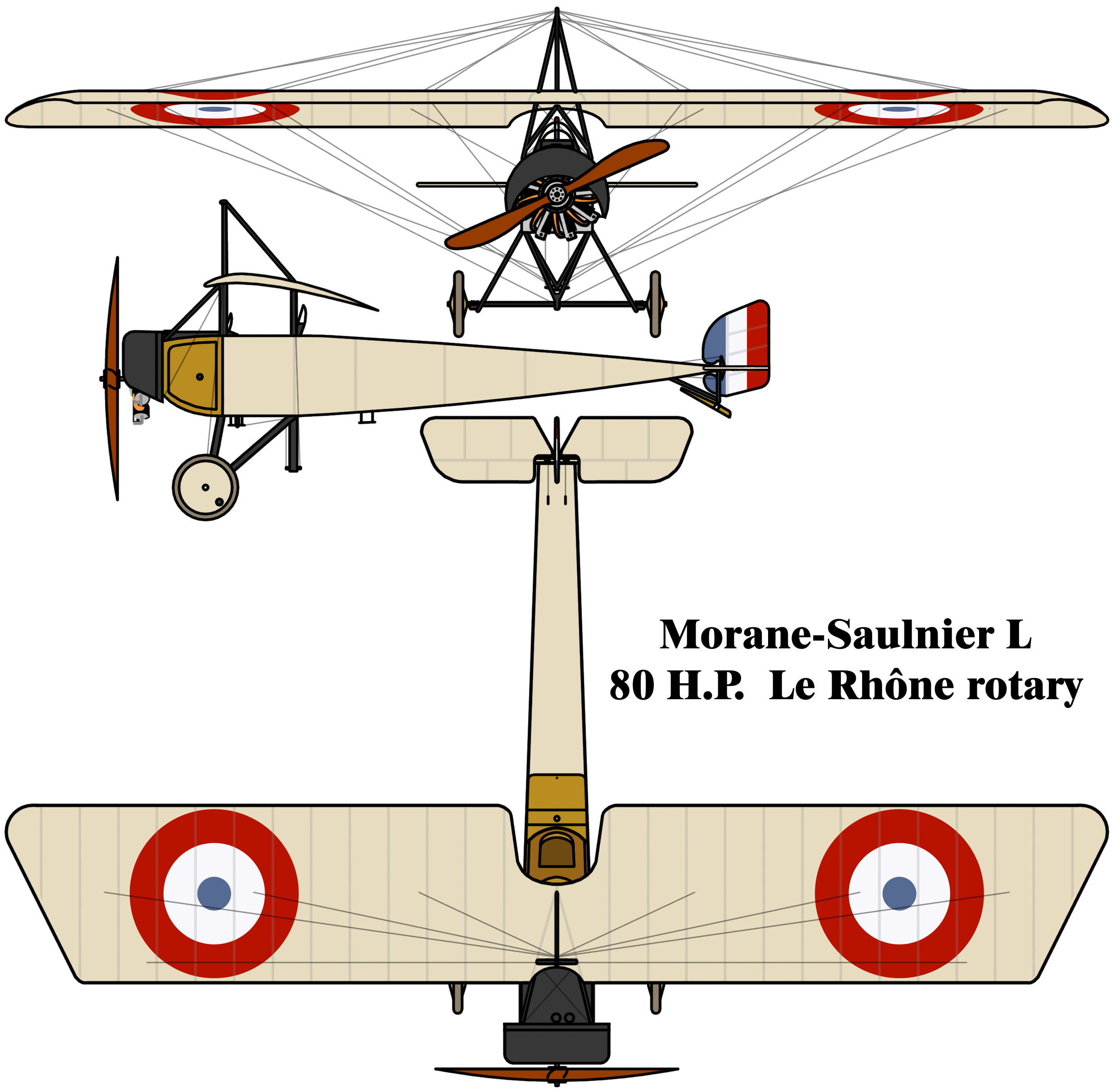
Morane Parasol, as flown by Cecil Lewis on 1 July 1916

2nd Lieutenant Cecil Lewis of 3 Squadron RFC, flying a Morane Parasol, watched from above Thiepval, almost 2 mi (3.2 km) away,

We were over Thiepval and turned south to watch the mines. As we sailed down above all, came the final moment. Zero! At Boisselle the earth heaved and flashed, a tremendous and magnificent column rose up into the sky. There was an ear-splitting roar, drowning all the guns, flinging the machine sideways in the repercussing air. The earthly column rose, higher and higher to almost four thousand feet. There it hung, or seemed to hang, for a moment in the air, like a silhouette of some great cypress tree, then fell away in a widening cone of dust and debris. A moment later came the second mine. Again the roar, the upflung machine, the strange gaunt silhouette invading the sky. Then the dust cleared and we saw the two white eyes of the craters. The barrage had lifted to the second-line trenches, the infantry were over the top, the attack had begun.

— Cecil Lewis, whose aircraft was hit by lumps of mud thrown up by the explosion.

== Analysis ==
The detonation of Y Sap and Lochnagar mines failed to neutralise the German defences in La Boisselle. The mines were expected to provide some protection against German machine-gun fire, by creating mounds around the crater rims and a smoke screen was to cover La Boisselle at zero hour but the wind blew it away from the village. Prior and Wilson criticised the bombardment plan for lifting the heavy artillery off the German front line at 7:00 a.m., thirty minutes before the infantry advance, which meant that its fire for the rest of the day was ineffective. Field artillery and field howitzers were left to suppress the German defenders for the last thirty minutes but had little destructive power against field fortifications. The German Moritz apparatus eavesdroppers, who warned of the attack, enabled the Germans to vacate the underground shelters near Y Sap in time and shoot down the infantry of the fourth brigade column. La Boisselle was meant to fall within twenty minutes but it was captured by the British and re-captured by the Germans several times before it finally fell on 4 July, the divisions III Corps having suffered more than 11,000 casualties, the worst losses of the British divisions engaged on 1 July. The 19th Division was rushed forward in case of a German counter-attack on Albert.

== Post-war ==
After the Armistice of 11 November 1918, the inhabitants of La Boisselle returned and rebuilt their houses. The Y Sap mine crater was filled in, landscaped and partly built over; it is no longer visible.

== See also ==
- List of the largest artificial non-nuclear explosions

== Bibliography ==
Books

- Edmonds, J. E. (1993) [1932]. Military Operations France and Belgium, 1916: Sir Douglas Haig's Command to the 1st July: Battle of the Somme. History of the Great War Based on Official Documents by Direction of the Historical Section of the Committee of Imperial Defence. Vol. I (Imperial War Museum and Battery Press ed.). London: Macmillan. ISBN 978-0-89839-185-5.
- Gilbert, M. (2007). Somme: The Heroism and Horror of War. London: John Murray. ISBN 978-0-7195-6890-9 – via Archive Foundation.
- Jones, Simon (2010). Underground Warfare 1914–1918. Barnsley: Pen & Sword Books. ISBN 978-1-84415-962-8.
- Kendall, P. (2015). Somme 1916: Success and Failure on the First Day of the Battle of the Somme. Barnsley: Frontline Books. ISBN 978-1-84832-905-8.
- Lewis, C. A. (1977) [1936]. Sagittarius Rising: The Classic Account of Flying in the First World War (2nd Penguin ed.). London: Peter Davis. ISBN 978-0-14-004367-9. OCLC 473683742.
- Miles, W. (1992) [1938]. Military Operations in France and Belgium: 2 July to the End of the Battles of the Somme. History of the Great War Based on Official Documents by Direction of the Historical Section of the Committee of Imperial Defence. Vol. II (Imperial War Museum and Battery Press ed.). London: Macmillan. ISBN 978-0-89839-169-5.
- Prior, R.; Wilson, T. (2005). The Somme. Yale University Press. ISBN 978-0-300-10694-7 – via Archive Foundation.
- Scotland, Thomas; Heys, Steven (2014). "La Boisselle and Ovillers, 1 July 1916". Understanding the Somme 1916: An Illuminating Battlefield Guide. Solihull: Helion. ISBN 978-1-910294-90-1.
- Shakespear, J. (2001) [1921]. The Thirty-Fourth Division, 1915–1919: The Story of its Career from Ripon to the Rhine (Naval & Military Press ed.). London: H. F. & G. Witherby. ISBN 978-1-84342-050-7. Archived from the original on 22 December 2019.
- Sheldon, J. (2006) [2005]. The German Army on the Somme 1914–1916 (Pen & Sword Military ed.). London: Leo Cooper. ISBN 978-1-84415-269-8.
- Whitehead, R. J. (2013) [2010]. The Other Side of the Wire: The Battle of the Somme. With the German XIV Reserve Corps, September 1914 – June 1916. Vol. I (pbk. repr. ed.). Solihull: Helion. ISBN 978-1-908916-89-1.

Websites

- Banning, J. (2011). "Tunnellers". La Boisselle Study Group.
- Dunning, R. (2015). "Military Mining". Lochnagar Crater. Archived from the original on 22 May 2015 – via Archive Foundation.
- "La Boisselle Map". lochnagarcrater.org. Archived from the original on 9 April 2016 – via Archive Foundation.
- Legg, J. (2013). "Lochnagar Mine Crater Memorial, La Boisselle, Somme Battlefields". greatwar.co.uk.
- Waugh, I. (2014). "WW1 Trip to the Somme". Old British News. Archived from the original on 19 October 2014.
