= Lochnagar mine =

Explosive-packed mine in the Battle of the Somme

- Part of the Battle of the Somme, First World War
- Battle of the Somme 1 July – 18 November 1916
Date	1 July 1916
Location	Picardy, France 50°00′56″N 2°41′50″E
Result	British victory

Belligerents
British Empire	Germany

Commanders and leaders
Douglas Haig	Erich von Falkenhayn
- Site of the Lochnagar mine, near La Boisselle

The Lochnagar mine south of the village of La Boisselle in the Somme département was an underground explosive charge, secretly planted by the British during the First World War, to be ready for 1 July 1916, the first day on the Somme. The mine was dug by the Tunnelling Companies of the Royal Engineers under a German field fortification known as Schwabenhöhe (Swabian Height). A large crater survived the war known as the Lochnagar crater (Trou de mine de La Boisselle).

The British named the mine after Lochnagar Street, the trench from which the gallery was driven. The charge at Lochnagar was one of 19 mines that were dug under the German lines on the British section of the Somme front, to assist the infantry advance at the start of the battle.

The mine was sprung at 7:28 a.m. on 1 July 1916 and left a crater 69 ft (21 m) deep and 330 ft (100 m) wide, which was captured and held by British troops. The attack on either flank was defeated by German small arms and artillery fire, except on the extreme right flank and just south of La Boisselle, north of the Lochnagar crater. The crater has been preserved as a memorial and a religious service is held each 1 July.

== Background ==
=== 1914 ===
French and German military operations began on the Somme in September 1914. A German advance westwards towards Albert was stopped by the French at La Boisselle and attempts to resume offensive warfare in October failed. Both sides reduced their attacks to local operations or raids and began to fortify their remaining positions with underground works. On 18 December, the French captured the La Boisselle village cemetery at the west end of a German salient and established an advanced post only 9.8 ft (3 m) from the German front line. By 24 December, the French had forced the Germans back from the cemetery and the western area of La Boisselle but their advance was stopped a short distance forward at L'îlot de La Boisselle, in front of German trenches protected by barbed wire. Once the location of a farm and a small number of buildings, L'îlot became known as Granathof (German, shell farm) to the Germans and later as the Glory Hole to the British. On Christmas Day 1914, French engineers sank the first mine shaft at La Boisselle.

=== 1915 ===
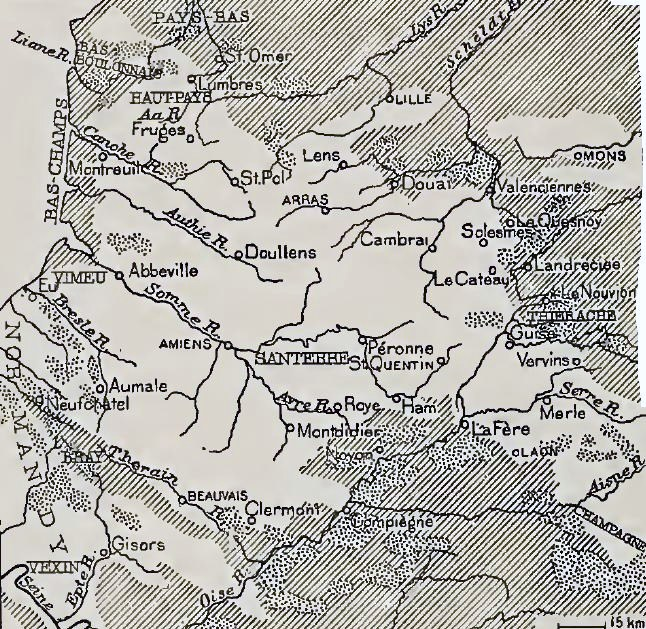
Map of chalk areas in northern France

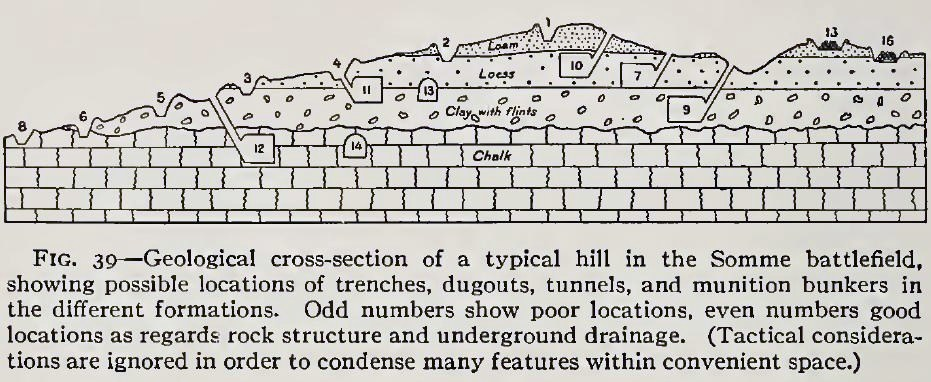
Geological cross-section of the Somme battlefield

Fighting continued in no man's land at the west end of La Boisselle, where the opposing lines were 200 yd (180 m) apart, even during lulls along the rest of the Somme front. On the night of 8/9 March, a German sapper inadvertently broke into a French mine gallery, which he found to have been charged with explosives; a group of volunteers took 45 nerve-racking minutes to dismantle the charge and cut the firing cables. The French mine workings were taken over when the British moved into the Somme front. George Fowke moved the 174th and 183rd Tunnelling Companies into the area; at first the British did not have enough miners to take over the many French shafts; the problem was temporarily solved when the French agreed to leave their engineers at work for several weeks.

On 24 July, 174th Tunnelling Company established headquarters at Bray, taking over some 66 shafts at Carnoy, Fricourt, Maricourt and La Boisselle. No man's land just south-west of La Boisselle was very narrow, at one point about 50 yd (46 m) wide, and had become pockmarked by many chalk craters. The British formed the 178th and 179th Tunnelling Companies in August, followed by the 185th and 252nd Tunnelling Companies in October. The 181st Tunnelling Company was also present on the Somme. Elaborate precautions were taken to preserve secrecy, since no continuous front line trench ran through the area opposite the west end of La Boisselle and the British front line. The L'îlot site was defended by posts near the mine shafts.

The underground war continued with offensive mining to destroy opposing strong points and defensive mining to destroy tunnels, which were 30–120 ft (9.1–36.6 m) long. Around La Boisselle, the Germans dug defensive transverse tunnels about 80 ft (24 m) long, parallel to the front line. On 19 November, the 179th Tunnelling Company commander, Captain Henry Hance, estimated that the Germans were 15 yd (14 m) away and ordered the mine chamber to be loaded with 6,000 lb (2.7 long tons; 2.7 t) of explosives, which was completed by midnight on 20/21 November. At 1:30 a.m. the Germans blew the charge, filling the remaining British tunnels with carbon monoxide. The right and left tunnels collapsed and it was later found that the German explosion had detonated the British charge. (Note: The wrecked tunnels were gradually re-opened but about thirty bodies remained beneath La Boisselle.) From April 1915 to January 1916, 61 mines were sprung around L'îlot, some loaded with 44,000–55,000 lb (20,000–25,000 kg) of explosives.

== Prelude ==
=== 1916 ===
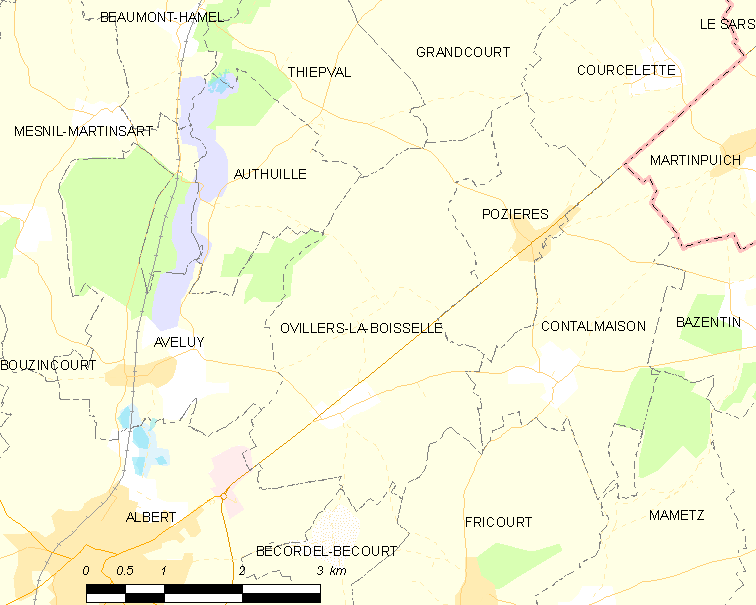
Map of the vicinity of Ovillers-La Boisselle (commune FR insee code 80615)

At the start of the Battle of Albert (1–13 July), the name given by the British to the first two weeks of the Battle of the Somme, La Boisselle stood on the main axis of British attack. Royal Engineer tunnelling companies were to make two contributions to the Allied preparations for the battle, by placing 19 mines of varying sizes beneath the German positions along the front line and by preparing a series of shallow Russian saps from the British front line into no man's land. The saps would be opened at Zero Hour and allow the infantry to attack the German positions from a comparatively short distance. At La Boisselle, four mines were prepared by the Royal Engineers, charges No 2 straight and No 5 right were planted at L'îlot at the end of galleries dug from Inch Street Trench by the 179th Tunnelling Company, intended to wreck German tunnels and create crater lips to block enfilade fire along no man's land.

The Germans in La Boisselle had fortified the cellars of the ruined houses and cratered ground in the vicinity made a direct infantry assault on the village impossible. Y Sap and Lochnagar mines, named after the trenches from which they were dug, were excavated on the north-east and the south-east of La Boisselle, to assist the attack on either side of the German salient in the village. The 185th Tunnelling Company started work on Lochnagar on 11 November 1915. Two officers and sixteen sappers were killed on 4 February, when the Germans detonated a camouflet near the British three-level mine system, starting from Inch Street, La Boisselle, the deepest level being just above the water table at around 100 ft (30 m). The diggings were handed over to 179th Tunnelling Company in March 1916.

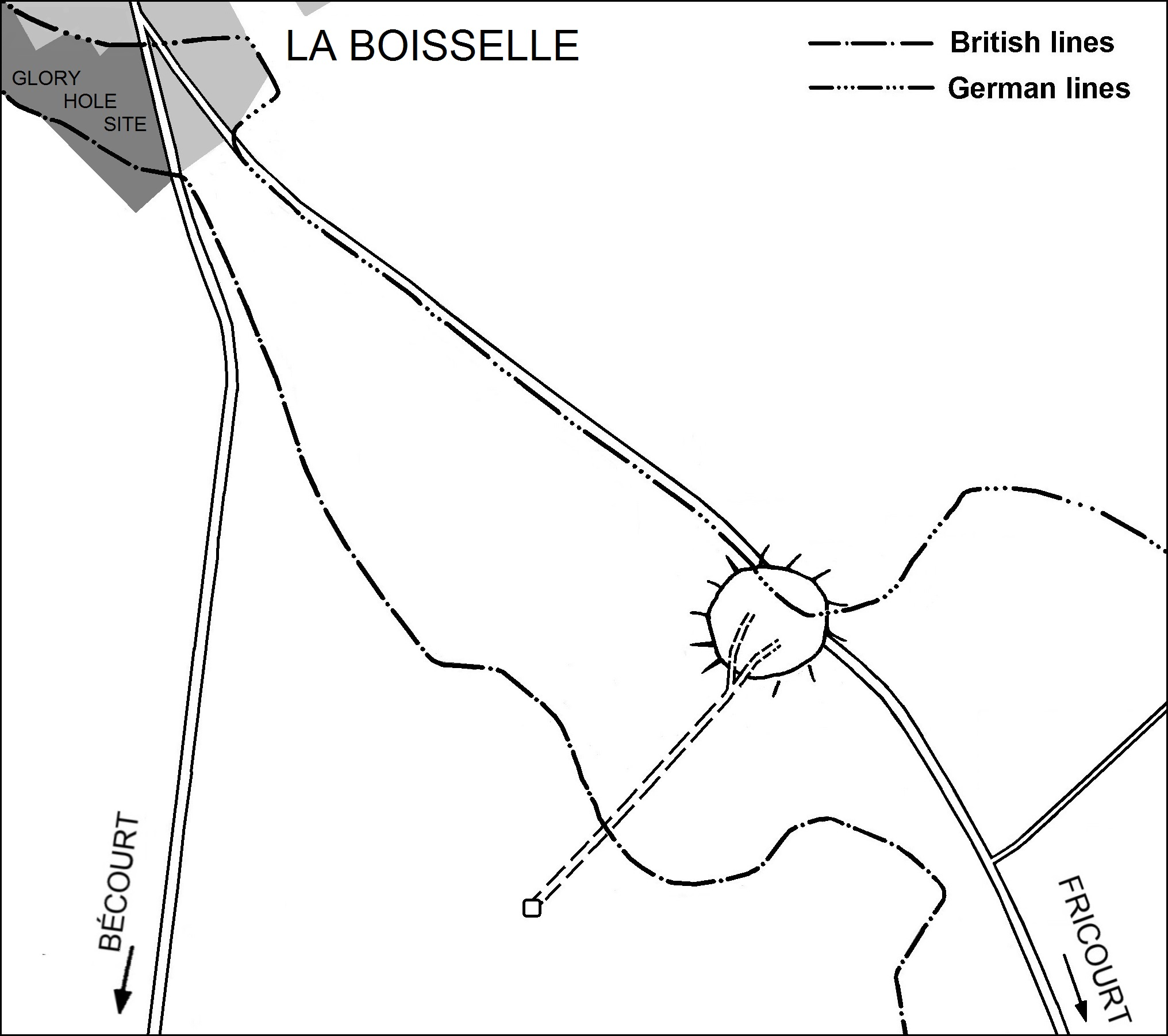
Plan of the Lochnagar mine

The Lochnagar mine consisted of two chambers with a shared access tunnel. The shaft was sunk in the communication trench called Lochnagar Street. After the Black Watch had arrived at La Boisselle at the end of July 1915, many fortifications, originally dug by the French, had been given Scottish names. The Lochnagar mine probably had the first deep incline shaft, which sloped from 1:2 to 1:3 to a depth of about 95 ft (29 m) see map. The tunnel was begun 300 ft (91 m) behind the British front line and 900 ft (270 m) away from the German front line. Starting from the inclined shaft, about 50 ft (15 m) below ground, a gallery was driven towards the German lines. For silence, the tunnellers used bayonets with spliced handles and worked barefoot on a floor covered with sandbags. Flints were carefully prised out of the chalk and laid on the floor; if the bayonet was manipulated two-handed, an assistant caught the dislodged material. Spoil was placed in sandbags and passed hand-by-hand along a row of miners sitting on the floor and stored along the side of the tunnel, later to be used to tamp the charge.

When about 135 ft (41 m) from the Schwabenhöhe, the tunnel was branched and the end of each branch was enlarged to form a chamber for the explosives, the chambers being about 60 ft (18 m) apart and 52 ft (16 m) deep. When finished, the access tunnel for the Lochnagar mine was 4.5 by 2.5 ft (1.37 by 0.76 m) and had been excavated at a rate of about 18 in (460 mm) per day, until about 1,030 ft (310 m) long, with the galleries ending beneath the Schwabenhöhe. The mine was loaded with 60,000 lb (27 long tons; 27 t) of ammonal in two charges of 36,000 lb (16 long tons; 16 t) and 24,000 lb (11 long tons; 11 t). As the chambers were not big enough to hold all the explosive, the tunnels that branched to form the 'Y' were also filled with ammonal. One branch was 60 ft (18 m) long and the other 40 ft (12 m) long. The tunnels did not quite reach the German front line but the blast would dislodge enough material to form a 15 ft (4.6 m) high rim and bury nearby trenches. The Lochnagar and the Y Sap mines were "overcharged" to ensure that large rims were formed from the disturbed ground. Communication tunnels were also dug for use immediately after the first attack, including a tunnel across no man's land to a point close to the Lochnagar mine, ready to extend to the crater after the detonation as a covered route. The mines were laid without interference by German miners but as the explosives were placed, German miners could be heard below Lochnagar and above the Y Sap mine.

An officer wrote

At one place in particular our men swore they thought he [the German enemy] was coming through, so we stopped driving forward and commenced to chamber in double shifts. We did not expect to complete it before he blew, but we did. A chamber 12 ft × 6 ft × 6 ft (3.7 m × 1.8 m × 1.8 m) was excavated in 24 hours. The Germans worked for a shift more than we did and then stopped. They knew we had chambered and were afraid we should blow and no more work was done there. I used to hate going to listen in that chamber more than any other place in the mine. Half an hour, sometimes once sometimes three times a day, in deadly silence with the geophone to your ears, wondering whether the sound you heard was the Boche working silently or your own heart beating. God knows how we kept our nerves and judgement. After the Somme attack when we surveyed the German mines and connected up to our own system, with the theodolite we found that we were five feet apart, and that he had only started his chamber and then stopped.

— Captain Stanley Bullock, 179th Tunnelling Company

== Battle ==
=== 1 July ===
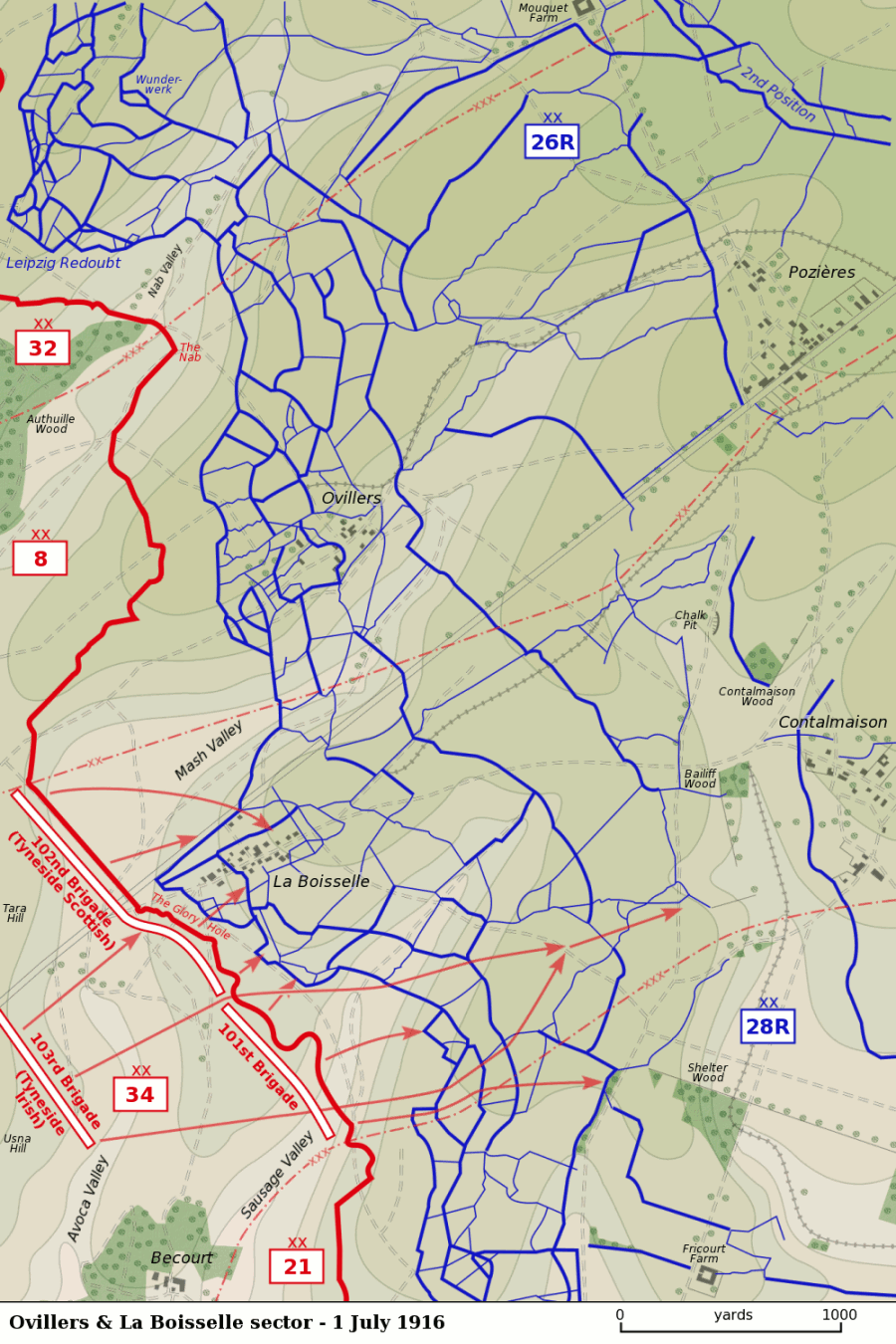
34th Division attack at La Boisselle, 1 July 1916

The four mines at La Boisselle were detonated at 7:28 a.m. on 1 July 1916, the first day on the Somme. The explosion of the Lochnagar mine was initiated by Captain James Young of the 179th Tunnelling Company, who pressed the switches and observed that the firing had been successful. The two charges of the Lochnagar mine created a smooth-sided, flat-bottomed crater 220 ft (67 m) in diameter excluding the lip and 450 ft (140 m) across the full extent of the lip. It had obliterated between 300 and 400 ft (91 and 122 m) of the German dug-outs, all said to have been full of German troops. The Lochnagar mine, along with Y Sap mine, was the largest mine ever detonated on the Western Front, though several mines on the Italian Front surpassed it in size. The sound of the blast was considered the loudest man-made noise in history up to that point, with reports suggesting it was heard in London. They would be surpassed a year later by the mines in the Battle of Messines. The Lochnagar mine lay on the sector assaulted by the Grimsby Chums, a Pals battalion (10th Battalion, The Lincolnshire Regiment). The infantry of the 34th Division, which was composed of Pals battalions from the English provinces, attacked the positions on either side of La Boisselle, of Reserve Infantry Regiment 110 (RIR 110) of the 28th Reserve Division, mainly recruited from Baden.

When the main attack began at 7:30 a.m., the Grimsby Chums occupied the crater and began to fortify the eastern lip, which dominated the vicinity; the advance continued to the Grüne Stellung (Green [second] position), where it was stopped by the 4th Company, RIR 110, which then counter-attacked and forced the British back to the crater. During the day, German artillery fired into Sausage Valley and in the afternoon began systematically to shell areas and then fire bursts of machine-gun fire to catch anyone who moved. German artillery also began to bombard the crater, where wounded and stragglers sought shelter, particularly those from Sausage Valley to the south of the village. British artillery began to fire on the crater, which led to shell bursts on both slopes, leaving the men inside with nowhere to hide. A British aircraft flew low overhead and a soldier waved a dead man's shirt, at which the aeroplane flew away and the British shelling stopped.

==== Aerial observation ====
The blowing of the Y Sap and Lochnagar mines was witnessed by pilots who were flying over the battlefield to report back on British troop movements. It had been arranged that continuous overlapping patrols would fly throughout the day. 2nd Lieutenant Cecil Lewis (3 Squadron) was warned against flying too close to La Boisselle during his patrol, where two mines were due to go up but watched from a safe distance. Flying up and down the line in a Morane Parasol, he watched from above Thiepval, almost two miles from La Boisselle and later described the early morning scene in his book Sagittarius Rising (1977),

We were over Thiepval and turned south to watch the mines. As we sailed down above all, came the final moment. Zero! At Boisselle the earth heaved and flashed, a tremendous and magnificent column rose up into the sky. There was an ear-splitting roar, drowning all the guns, flinging the machine sideways in the repercussing air. The earthly column rose, higher and higher to almost four thousand feet. There it hung, or seemed to hang, for a moment in the air, like a silhouette of some great cypress tree, then fell away in a widening cone of dust and debris. A moment later came the second mine. Again the roar, the upflung machine, the strange gaunt silhouette invading the sky. Then the dust cleared and we saw the two white eyes of the craters. The barrage had lifted to the second-line trenches, the infantry were over the top, the attack had begun.

— Cecil Lewis, whose aircraft was hit by lumps of mud thrown up by the explosion.

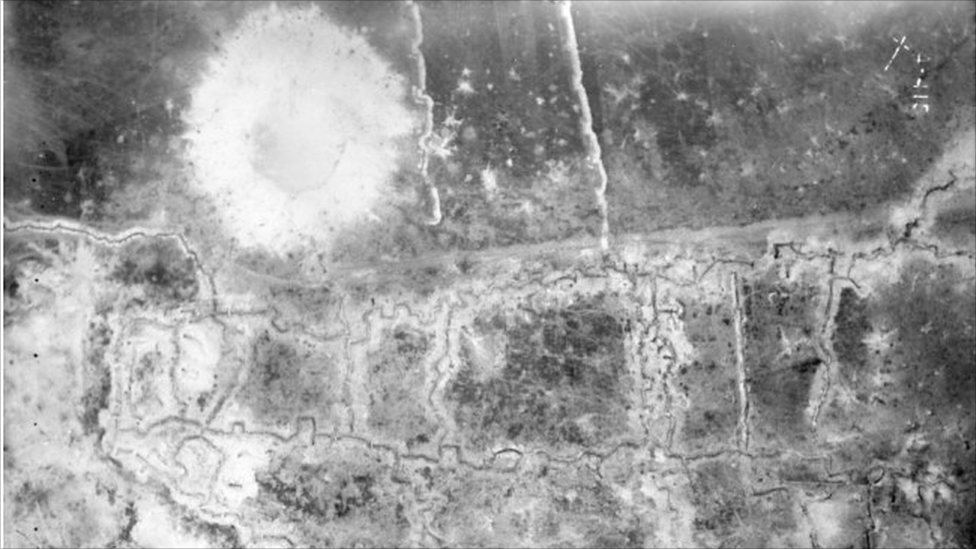
Contemporaneous British aerial photograph showing the crater and trenches

As aircraft from 3 Squadron flew over the III Corps area, observers reported that the 34th Division had reached Peake Wood on the right flank, increasing the size of the salient which had been driven into the German lines north of Fricourt but that the villages of La Boisselle and Ovillers had not fallen. On 3 July, air observers noted flares lit in the village during the evening, which were used to plot the positions reached by British infantry.

A communication tunnel was used to contact troops near the new crater and during the afternoon, troops from the 9th Cheshires of the 19th (Western) Division began to move forward and a doctor was sent from the Field Ambulance during the night. By 2:50 a.m. on 2 July, most of the 9th Cheshires had reached the crater and the German trenches adjacent, from which they repulsed several German counter-attacks during the night and the morning. On the evening of 2 July, the evacuation of wounded began and on 3 July, troops from the crater and the vicinity pushed forward to the south-east, occupying a small area against slight opposition.

== Analysis ==
Despite their colossal size, the Lochnagar and Y Sap mines failed sufficiently to neutralise the German defences in La Boisselle. The ruined village was meant to be captured in 20 minutes but by the end of the first day on the Somme, the III Corps divisions had suffered more than 11,000 casualties for no result. At Mash Valley, the attackers lost 5,100 men before noon and at Sausage Valley near the crater of the Lochnagar mine, there were over 6,000 casualties, the highest concentration on the battlefield. The 34th Division in III Corps had suffered the greatest number of casualties of the British divisions engaged on 1 July.

== Commemoration ==
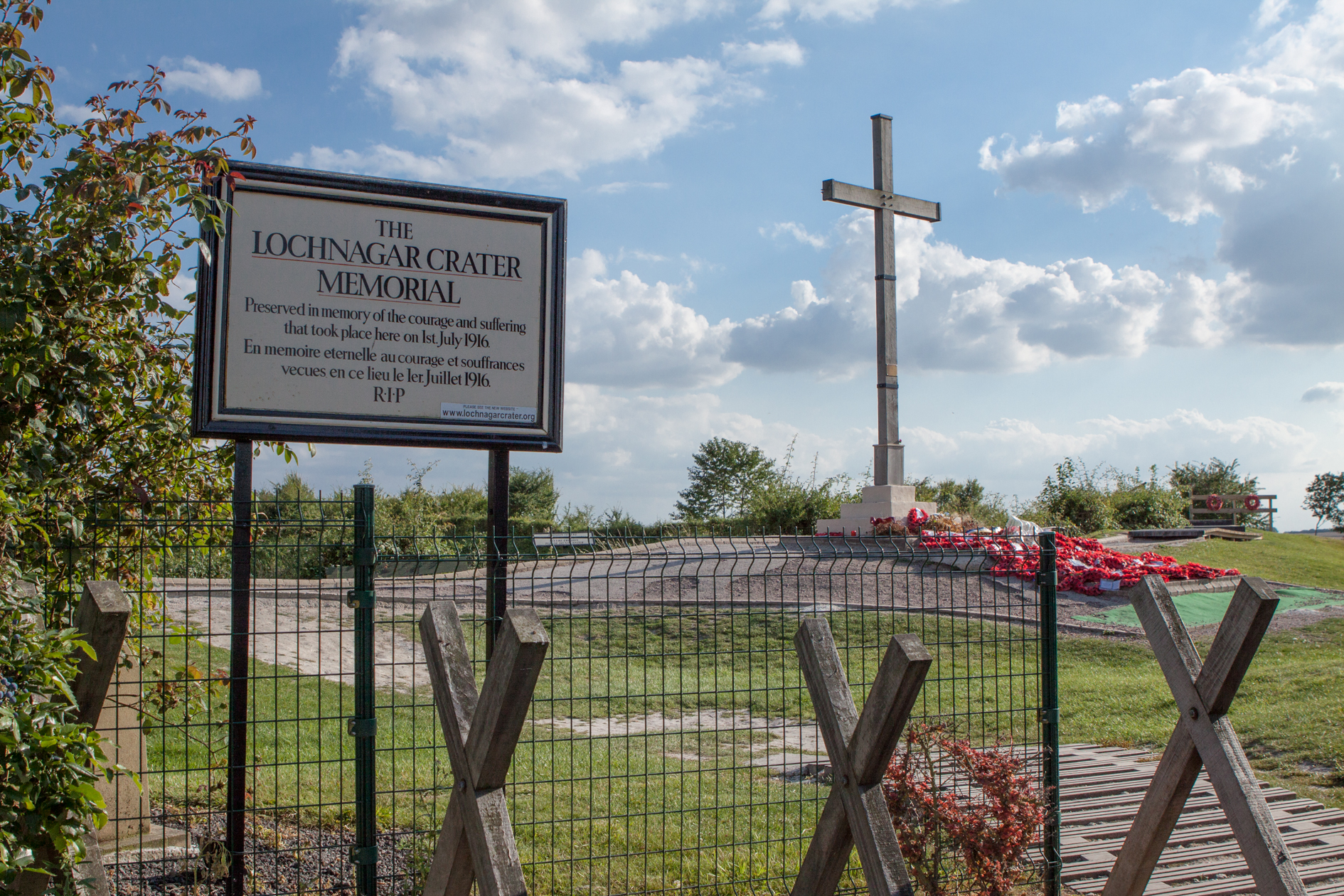
The memorial cross

William Orpen, an official war artist, saw the mine crater in 1916 while touring the Somme battlefield, collecting subjects for paintings and described a wilderness of chalk dotted with shrapnel. John Masefield also visited the Somme, while preparing The Old Front Line (1917), in which he also described the area around the crater as dazzlingly white and painful to look at. After the war the Café de la Grande Mine was built nearby; after the Second World War, many of the smaller craters were filled but the Lochnagar mine crater remained. Attempts to fill it in were resisted and the land was eventually purchased by an Englishman, Richard Dunning to ensure its preservation, after he read The Old Front Line and was inspired to buy a section of the former front line.

Dunning made more than 200 enquiries about land sales in the 1970s and was sold the crater. The site had been used by cross-country motorbikes and for fly tipping but Dunning erected a memorial cross on the rim of the crater in 1986, using reclaimed timber from a Gateshead church; the cross was struck by lightning shortly after its installation and was repaired with metal banding. The site attracts about 200,000 visitors a year and there is an annual memorial service on 1 July, to commemorate the detonation of the mine and the British, French and German war dead, when poppy petals are scattered into the crater. Richard Dunning, the owner of the crater, was awarded an MBE in the 2017 New Year Honours for services to First World War remembrance.

== Gallery ==
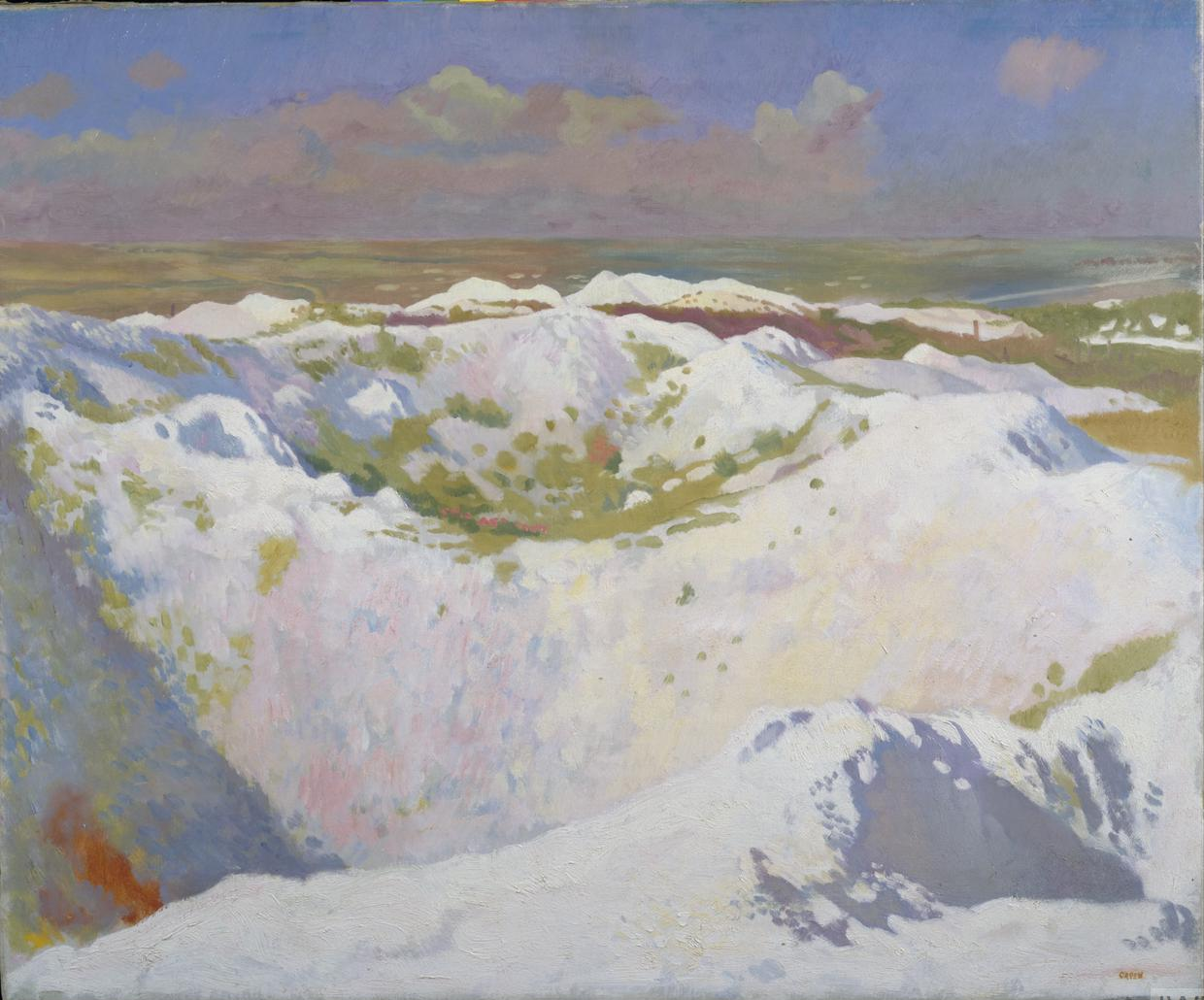
William Orpen: Mines and the Bapaume Road, La Boisselle (Art.IWMART2962)

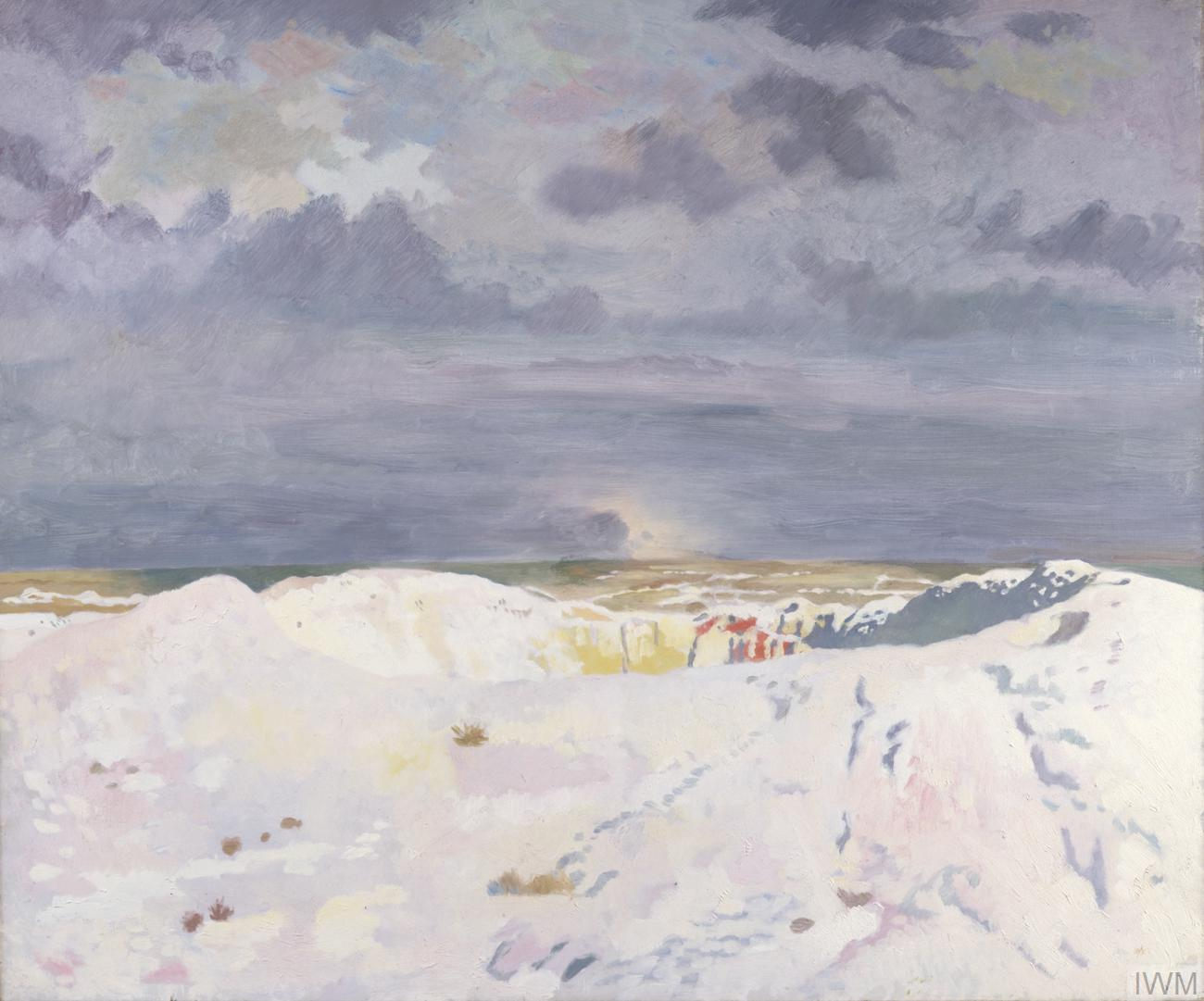
Orpen: The Great Mine, La Boisselle (Art.IWMART2379)

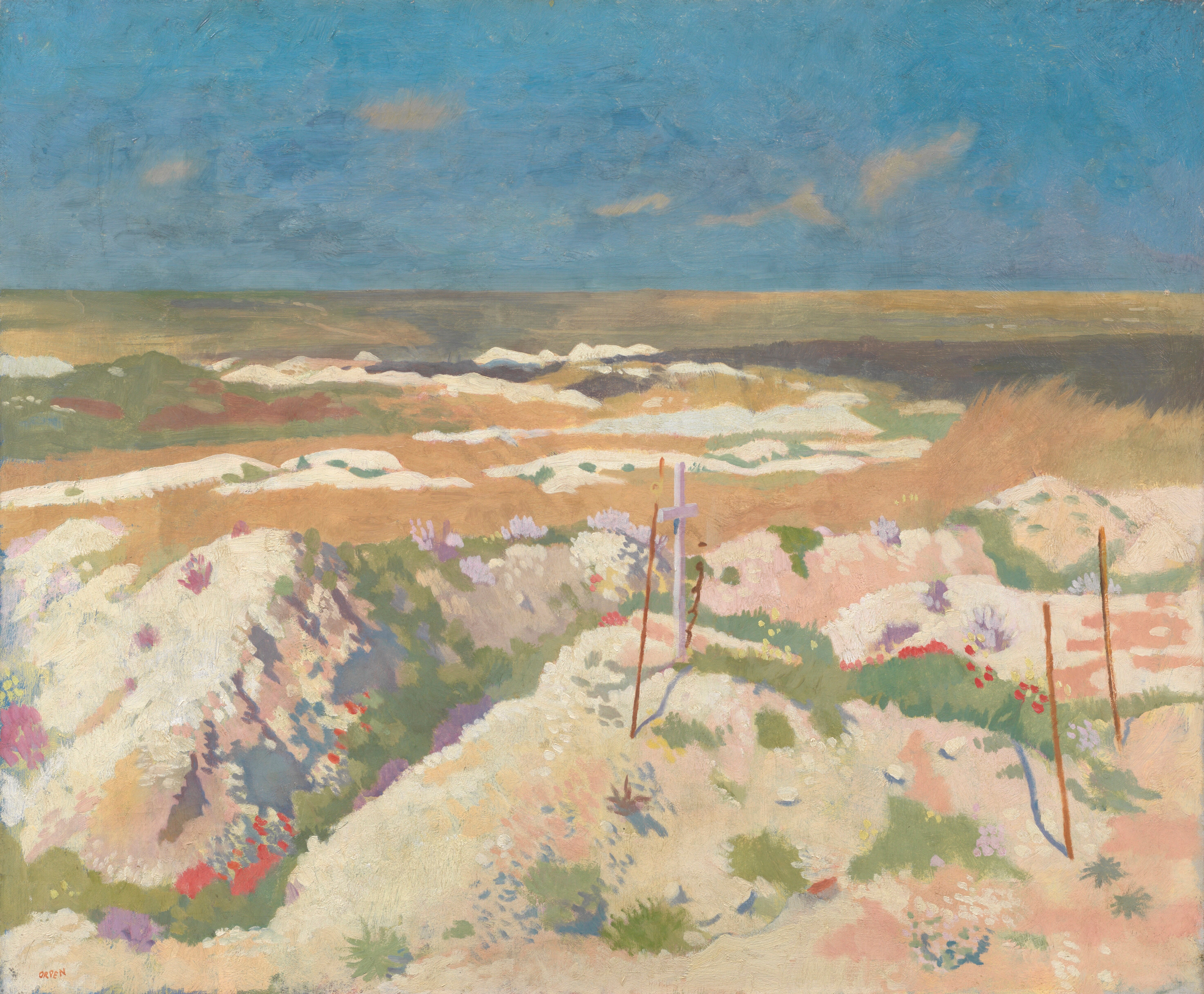
A Grave and a Mine Crater at La Boisselle, August 1917 (Art.IWMART2378)

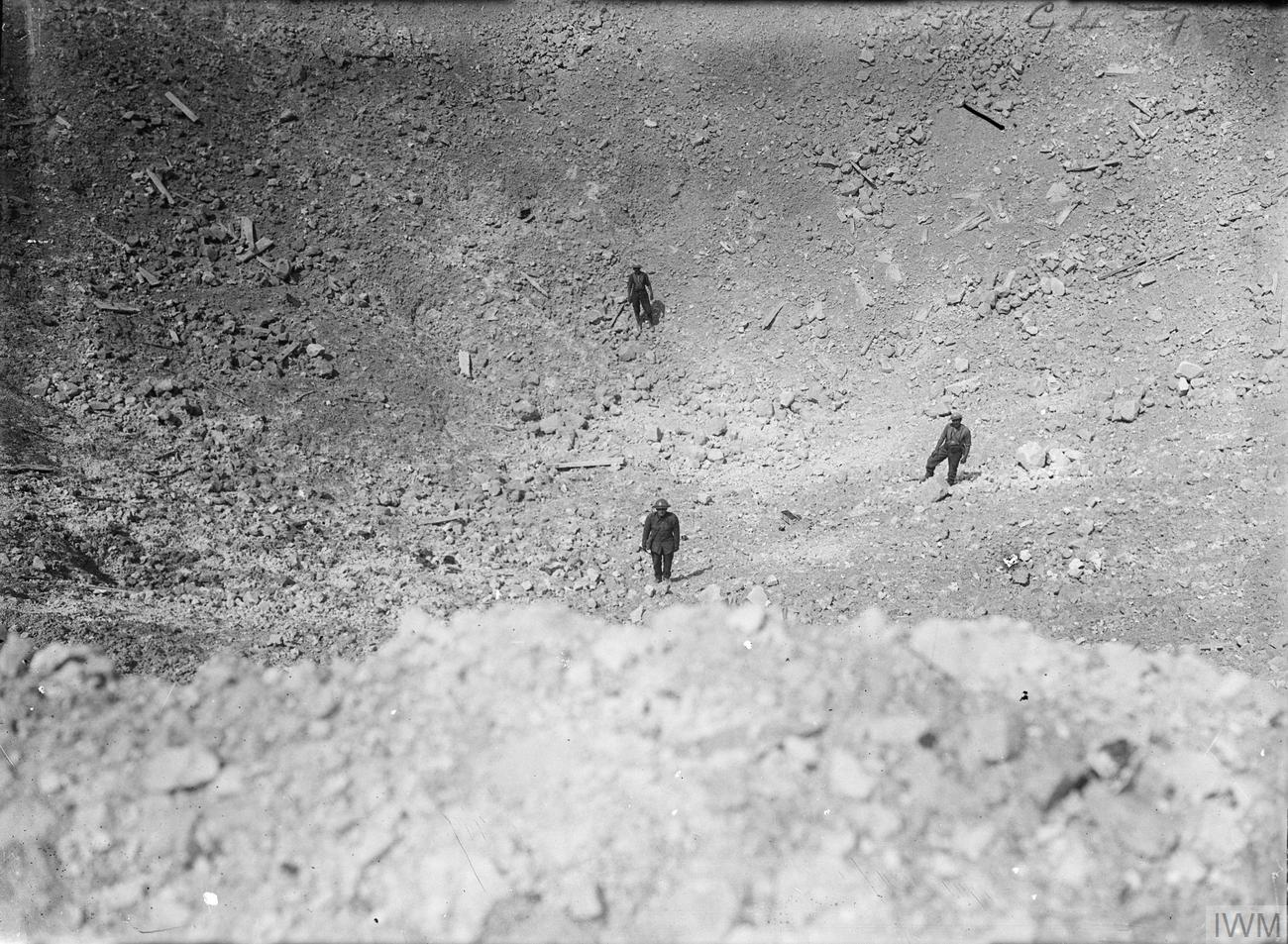
La Boisselle mine crater, August 1916 (IWM Q 912)

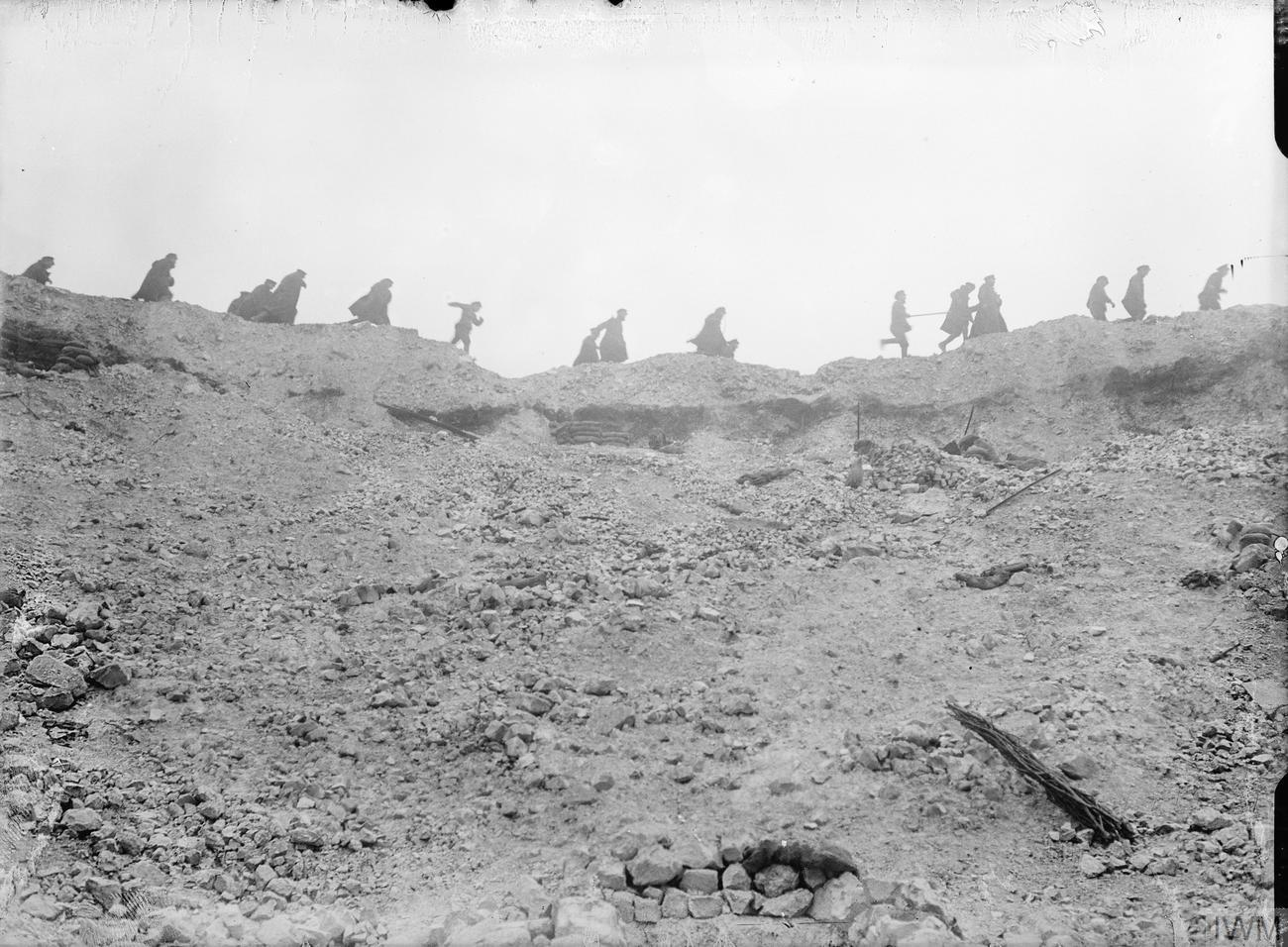
Troops passing Lochnagar Crater, October 1916 (IWM Q 1479)

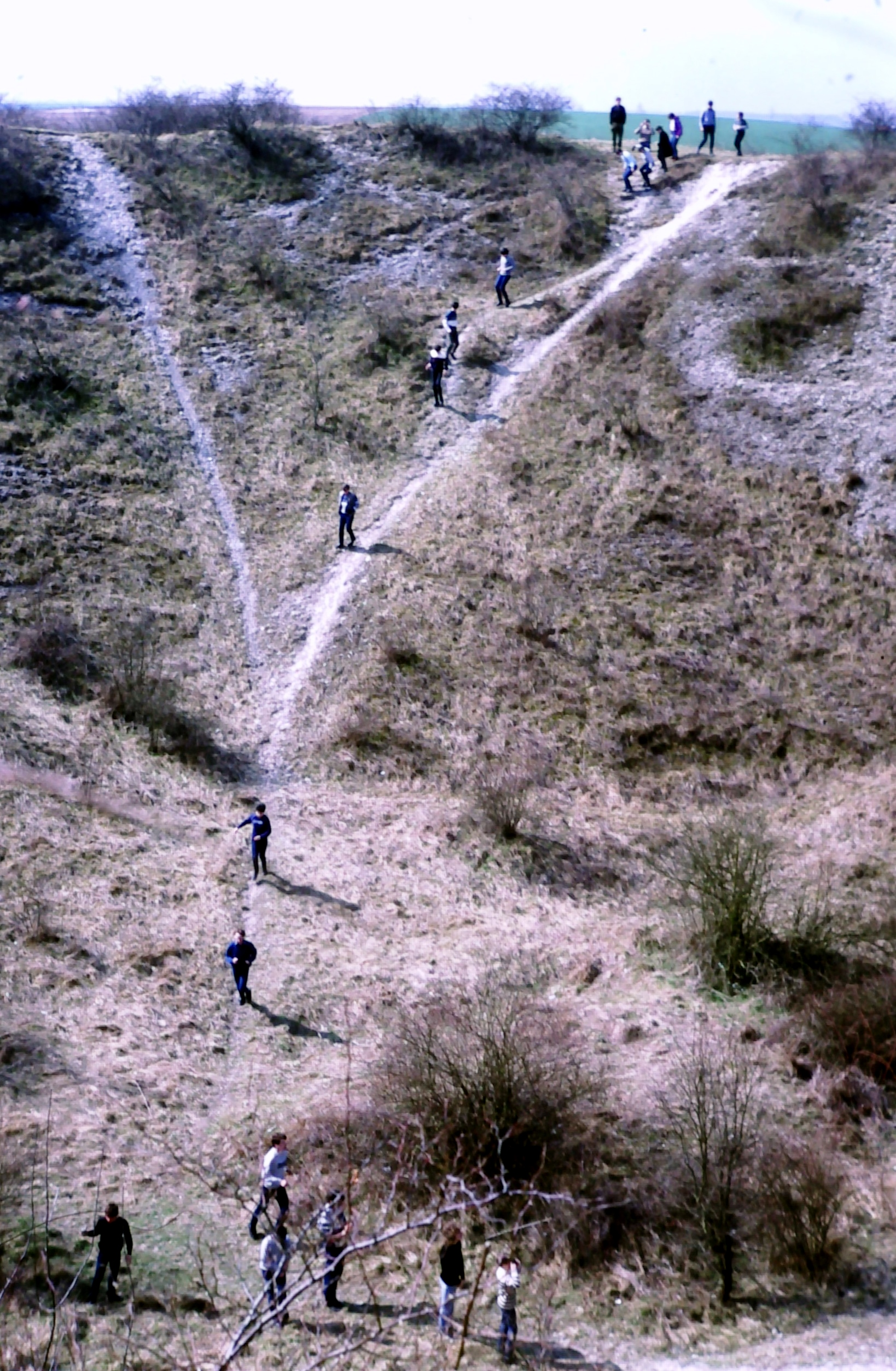
Lochnagar Crater, La Boisselle 1984

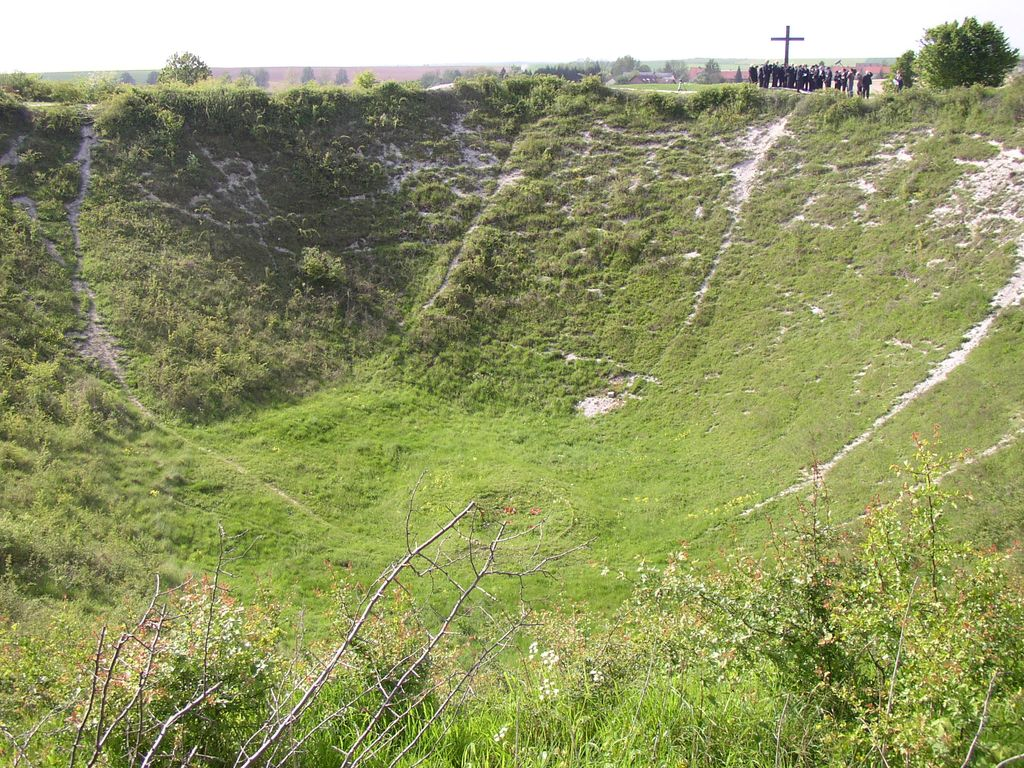
Lochnagar Crater, Ovillers

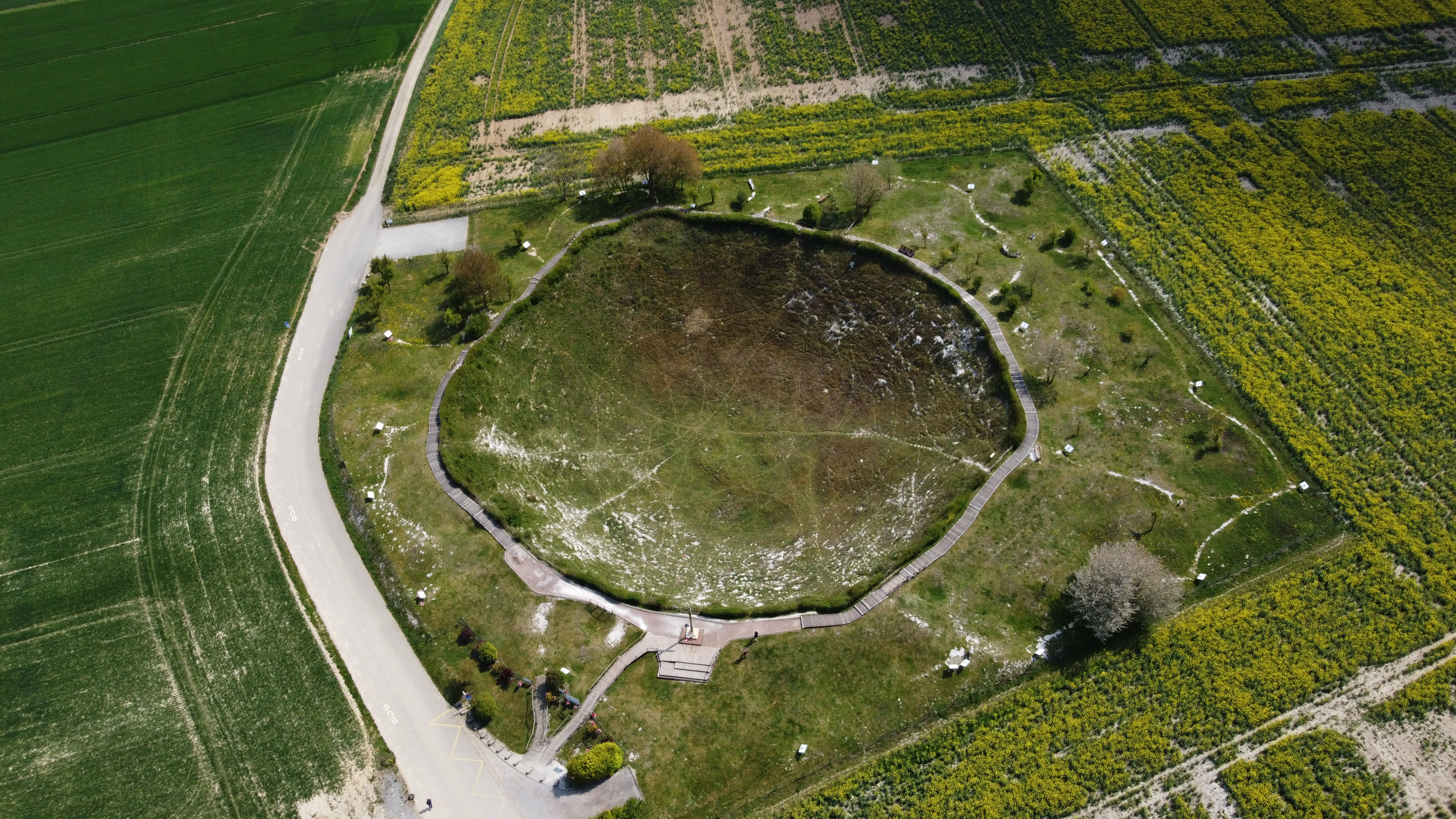
Aerial view (2021)

== See also ==
- List of the largest artificial non-nuclear explosions
- The Battle of the Crater from the American Civil War

== Bibliography ==
Books

- Edmonds, J. E. (1993) [1932]. Military Operations France and Belgium, 1916: Sir Douglas Haig's Command to the 1st July: Battle of the Somme. History of the Great War Based on Official Documents by Direction of the Historical Section of the Committee of Imperial Defence. Vol. I (Imperial War Museum and Battery Press ed.). London: Macmillan. ISBN 978-0-89839-185-5.
- Gilbert, M. (2007). Somme: The Heroism and Horror of War. London: John Murray. ISBN 978-0-7195-6890-9 – via Archive Foundation.
- Gliddon, G. (1987). When the Barrage Lifts: A Topographical History and Commentary on the Battle of the Somme 1916. Norwich: Gliddon Books. ISBN 978-0-947893-02-6.
- Jones, H. A. (2002) [1928]. The War in the Air, Being the Story of the Part Played in the Great War by the Royal Air Force. Vol. II (Imperial War Museum Department of Printed Books and Naval & Military Press ed.). London: Clarendon Press. ISBN 978-1-84342-413-0 – via Archive Foundation.
- Jones, Simon (2010). Underground Warfare 1914-1918. Barnsley: Pen & Sword Books. ISBN 978-1-84415-962-8.
- Lewis, C. A. (1977) [1936]. Sagittarius Rising: The Classic Account of Flying in the First World War (2nd Penguin ed.). London: Peter Davis. ISBN 0-14-00-4367-5.
- Masefield, J. (1917). The Old Front Line. New York: Macmillan. OCLC 869145562 – via Archive Foundation.
- Middlebrook, M. (1971). The First Day on the Somme. London: Penguin Books. ISBN 978-0-14-139071-0.
- Shakespear, J. (2001) [1921]. The Thirty-Fourth Division, 1915–1919: The Story of its Career from Ripon to the Rhine (Naval & Military Press, Uckfield ed.). London: H. F. & G. Witherby. ISBN 1-84342-050-3. Archived from the original on 22 December 2019 – via British Library.
- Sheldon, J. (2006) [2005]. The German Army on the Somme 1914–1916 (Pen & Sword Military ed.). London: Leo Cooper. ISBN 978-1-84415-269-8.
- Skinner, J. (2012). Writing the Dark Side of Travel. New York: Berghahn Books. ISBN 978-0-85745-341-9.
- Whitehead, R. J. (2013) [2010]. The Other Side of the Wire: The Battle of the Somme. With the German XIV Reserve Corps, September 1914 – June 1916. Vol. I (pbk. repr. ed.). Solihull: Helion. ISBN 978-1-908916-89-1.
- Whitehead, R. J. (2013a). The Other Side of the Wire: The Battle of the Somme. With the German XIV Reserve Corps, 1 July 1916. Vol. II. Solihull: Helion. ISBN 978-1-907677-12-0.
- Wyrall, E. (2009) [1932]. The Nineteenth Division 1914–1918 (Naval & Military Press, Uckfield ed.). London: Edward Arnold. ISBN 978-1-84342-208-2.

Websites

- Banning, J. (2011). "Tunnellers". La Boisselle Study Group. Archived from the original on 27 June 2015.
- Dunning, R. (2015). "Military Mining". Lochnagar Crater. Archived from the original on 28 June 2018.
- Fenwick, S. C. (4 December 2008). "Corps History: Part 14, the Corps and the First World War (1914–18)". Royal Engineers Museum and Library. Archived from the original on 3 June 2010.
- Legg, J. (2013). "Lochnagar Mine Crater Memorial, La Boisselle, Somme Battlefields". www.greatwar.co.uk. Archived from the original on 11 December 2023.
- Waugh, I. (2014). "WW1 Trip to the Somme". Old British News. Archived from the original on 19 October 2014.
