= L'îlot de La Boisselle =

Site known as Glory Hole to British soldiers during World War I

Coordinates: 50.0185°N 2.691°E

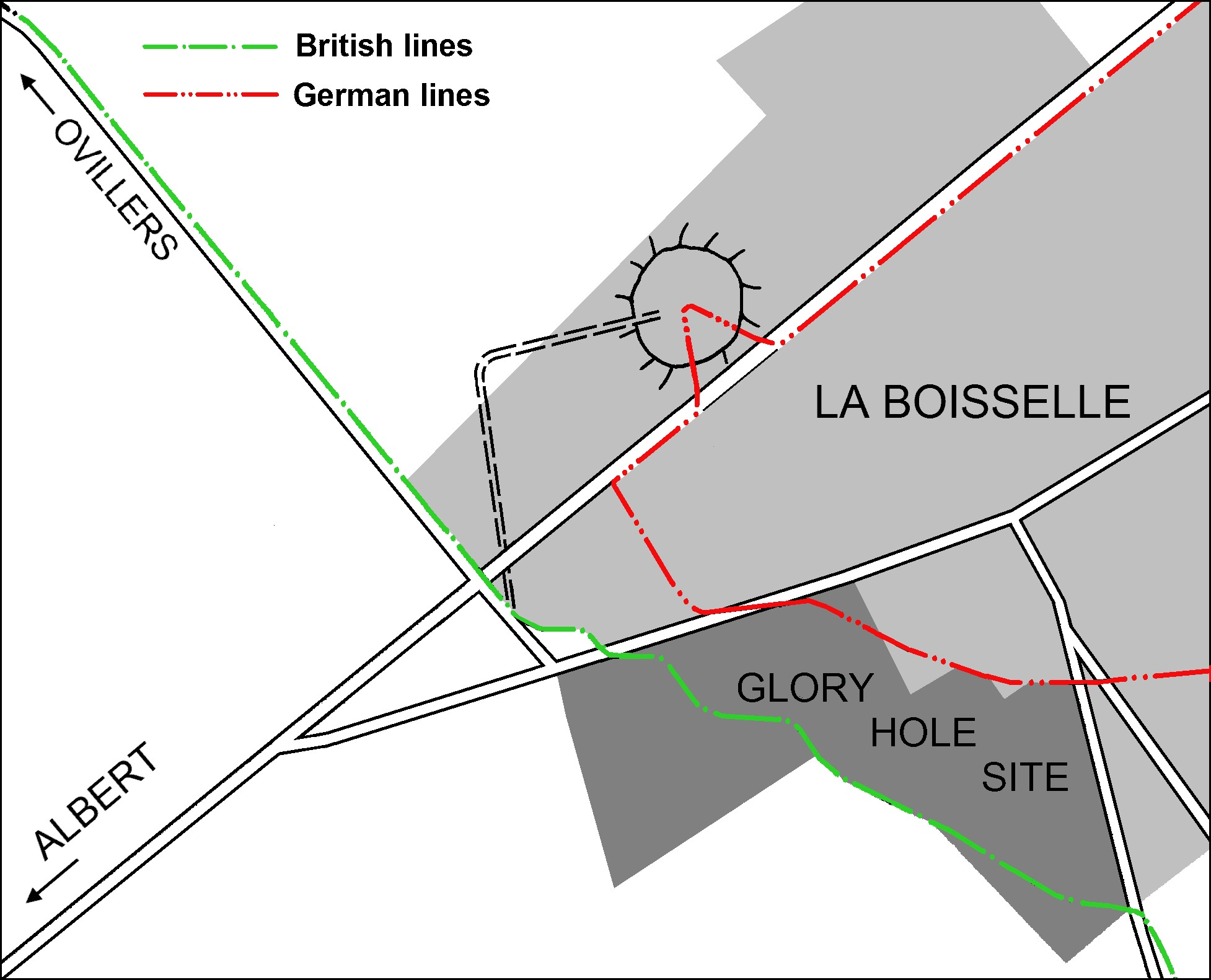
Locations of L'îlot de La Boisselle and the Y Sap mine

L'îlot de La Boisselle (French: ilôt meaning "small island") is a small, 3.12-hectare (7.7-acre) historic site in the commune of Ovillers-la-Boisselle in the Somme department in Picardie in northern France. L'îlot was heavily fought over during the First World War, when it was known as Granathof (German: "shell farm") to the Germans and as Glory Hole to British soldiers. The site is private property and opens to the public by appointment with Claudie Llewellyn (who lives in Montauban-de-Picardie).

== Geography ==
Located in the small village of La Boisselle, the site lies south of the D 929 Albert–Bapaume road and occupies a small area in the southeast of the village (see photographs). Once the location of a small number of houses, L'îlot is now covered with grass and shrubs and separated from the built over areas of the village by the rue Georges Cuvillier (D 104) leading to Contalmaison in the north and the route de Bécourt leading to Bécordel-Bécourt in the east.

== History ==
La Boisselle is a settlement dating back to pre-Roman times. The D 929 Albert–Bapaume road follows the course of a Roman road. After the Battle of Bapaume during the Franco-Prussian War (1870–1871), the village suffered serious damage. It was a place of armed struggle during the first war on surface trenches and in depth with mining galleries and mines explosions opposing French then British troops against German troops. It shows several mine craters and a mining galerie. The terrain was never modified after World War I.

=== 1914 ===
During the Battle of Albert (25–29 September 1914), French units were forced back from Bapaume but were able to stop the German advance along the D 929 Albert–Bapaume road at La Boisselle. After their advance had been brought to a halt, the Germans brought in heavy artillery and began to shell the French, who withdrew their infantry from the village but soon began to fortify their remaining positions with underground works. On 18 December, a French attack captured the village cemetery at the west end of a German salient in La Boisselle. The French had sapped forward for several weeks and a shortage of artillery ammunition had left the Germans unable to stop the French progress. When the attack came, the French were only 15 metres (16 yd) from the German front line and then established an advanced post only 3 metres (3.3 yd) away. The French attacks forced the Germans back from the village cemetery and the western area of La Boisselle by 24 December, but the advance was stopped a short distance forward at L'îlot, in front of German trenches protected by barbed wire. On Christmas Day 1914, French engineers began to sink the first mine shaft at La Boisselle. Local but heavy fighting underground in the winter of 1914 and spring of 1915 also took place at nearby Fricourt, Bois Français and Carnoy.

The Germans, meanwhile, remained in the ruins of La Boisselle and fortified the ground they had gained with barbed-wire entanglements so that the front trench could be held with fewer troops. No man's land around La Boisselle varied from 50–800 yd (46–732 m) wide, the area of L'îlot being the narrowest part. The site thus became part of the Western Front, a line that stretched from the North Sea to Switzerland and which remained essentially unchanged for most of the entire war.

=== 1915 ===
From January 1915 to the start of the Battle of the Somme in July 1916, L'îlot was the scene of fierce underground fighting. Having started mining at La Boisselle shortly after the French, the Bavarian Engineer Regiment 1 continued digging eight galleries towards L'îlot. On 5 January, French sappers were heard digging near a gallery and a 300-kilogram (660 lb) camouflet was quickly placed in the gallery and blown, collapsing the French digging and two German galleries in the vicinity. A 600-kilogram (1,300 lb) charge was blown on 12 January, which killed more than forty French soldiers. On the night of 6/7 February, three more German mines were sprung close to L'îlot. After the explosions, a large party of German troops advanced and occupied the demolished buildings but were not able to advance further against French artillery and small-arms fire. At 3:00 p.m. a French counter-attack drove back the Germans and inflicted about 150 casualties. For several days, both sides detonated mines and conducted artillery bombardments, which often prevented infantry attacks. On the night of 8/9 March, a German sapper at La Boisselle inadvertently broke into a French gallery, which was found to have been charged with explosives; a group of volunteers took 45 nerve racking minutes to dismantle the charge and cut the firing cables. Between April 1915 and January 1916 alone, sixty-one mines were sprung around L'îlot, some with 20,000–25,000 kg (44,000–55,000 lb) of explosives.

In summer 1915, the French mine workings around La Boisselle were taken over by the Royal Engineers as the British moved into the Somme front. G.F. Fowke sent the 174th and 183rd Tunnelling Companies into the area, but at first the British did not have enough miners to take over the large number of French shafts; the problem was temporarily solved when the French agreed to leave their engineers at work for several weeks. On 24 July 1915, 174th Tunnelling Company established headquarters at Bray, taking over some 66 shafts at Carnoy, Fricourt, Maricourt and La Boisselle. After the Black Watch arrived at La Boissselle at the end of July 1915, existing trenches, originally dug by the French, were renamed by the Scottish troops which explains the presence of many Scotland-related names for the Allied fortifications in that front sector. To provide the tunnellers needed on the Somme front, the British formed the 178th and 179th Tunnelling Companies in August 1915, followed by the 185th and 252nd Tunnelling Companies in October. The 181st Tunnelling Company was also present on the Somme.

At La Boisselle, elaborate precautions were taken to preserve secrecy, since no continuous front line trench ran through L'îlot, which was defended by posts near the mine shafts. No man's land just south-west of La Boisselle was very narrow, at one point about 46 metres (50 yd) wide, and had become pockmarked by many chalk craters. The underground war continued with offensive mining to destroy opposing strong points and defensive mining to destroy tunnels, which were 30–120 feet (9.1–36.6 m) long. Around La Boisselle, the Germans dug defensive transverse tunnels about 80 feet (24 m) long, parallel to the front line. In addition to digging defensive tunnels to obstruct German mining and creating offensive galleries aimed at destroying German fortifications, the Royal Engineers also dug deep wells to supply the troops with drinking water.

In August 1915, the French and Germans were working at a depth of 12 metres (39 ft); the size of their charges had reached 3,000 kilograms (6,600 lb). The British tunnelling companies dramatically increased the scale of mining operations by extending and deepening the system, first to 24 metres (79 ft) and ultimately 30 metres (98 ft). (Note: See also The real hero tunnellers of World War One who inspired BBC's Birdsong, www.mirror.co.uk, 21 January 2012 (online), access date 6 July 2015, where the date of the detonation is given with 22 October 1915.)

=== 1916 ===
On the First day of the Somme, 1 July 1916, the D 929 Albert–Bapaume road was to be the main axis of the Allied attack. The British infantry was to attack with a gap at La Boisselle, which could not to be attacked directly as the deeply-cratered ground around L'îlot made a direct assault on the ruined village impossible. The tunnelling companies were to make two major contributions to the Allied preparations for the battle by placing 19 large and small mines beneath the German positions along the front line and by preparing a series of shallow Russian saps from the British front line into no man's land, which would be opened at Zero Hour and allow the infantry to attack the German positions from a comparatively short distance.

At La Boisselle, two mines with 3,600-kilogram (8,000 lb) charges (known as No 2 straight and No 5 right) were planted at L'îlot, at the end of galleries dug from Inch Street Trench by the 179th Tunnelling Company. To assist the attack on the village, two further mines, known as Y Sap and Lochnagar after the trenches from which they were dug, were placed to the north-east and the south-east of La Boisselle. These four mines were detonated by the Royal Engineers at 7:28 a.m. on 1 July 1916, two minutes before Zero Hour and 15 other mines were fired along other sectors of the Somme front line.

The British attack on the ruins of La Boisselle on 1 July 1916 turned into a disaster: Despite their colossal size, the Lochnagar and Y Sap mines failed to help sufficiently neutralise the German defences in the village, and the German troops had deep shelters that withstood the British artillery fire. La Boisselle was meant to fall in 20 minutes, but by the end of the first day of the battle, neither La Boisselle nor Ovillers had been taken while the III Corps divisions had lost more than 11,000 casualties. At Mash Valley, the attackers lost 5,100 men before noon, and at Sausage Valley near the crater of the Lochnagar mine, there were over 6,000 casualties – the highest concentration on the entire battlefield. The III Corps' 34th Division suffered the worst losses of any unit that day. On 2 July, the British managed to cross L'îlot, capture the German front line trench, occupy the west end of the ruined village by 9:00 p.m. and to dig in near the church. The next day, the British gradually managed to drive the German units from La Boisselle, which was fully in Allied hands by 6 July. As the Allied advance continued down the D 929 Albert–Bapaume road until the end of the Battle of the Somme in mid-November, L'îlot de La Boisselle became redundant. Barton estimates that over 120 British and French miners died in the underground fighting on the site.

=== After the war ===
After the Armistice of 11 November 1918, the former inhabitants of La Boisselle returned and L'îlot became private land again, although the farm and the other houses that had stood there before the First World War were not rebuilt. The deeply-cratered ground was left to the elements and the site gradually overgrew with grass and shrubs, thus preserving many wartime features of this former sector of the front line. L'îlot is not normally open to the public, upon appointment.

== Exploration ==
In 2011, British researchers around Peter Barton started an archaeological, historical, technological and genealogical study of La Boisselle with a special focus on L'îlot. After the removal of bushes and undergrowth, excavations revealed that the site still holds traces of trenches, shelters and extensive tunnels related to underground warfare. A network of some 7 kilometres (4.3 mi) of tunnels at depths of between 12 metres (13 yd) and 30 metres (33 yd) has so far been rediscovered. Now the terrain is under the safeguard of an association : l'Association des Amis de l'Ilôt de La Boisselle (see website and facebook).

== See also ==
- Ovillers-la-Boisselle in World War I
