= The Old Front Line =

Military history book by English poet John Masefield

- Author: John Masefield
- Language: English
- Genre: Non-fiction
- Publication date: 1917
- ISBN: 0-85052-936-0

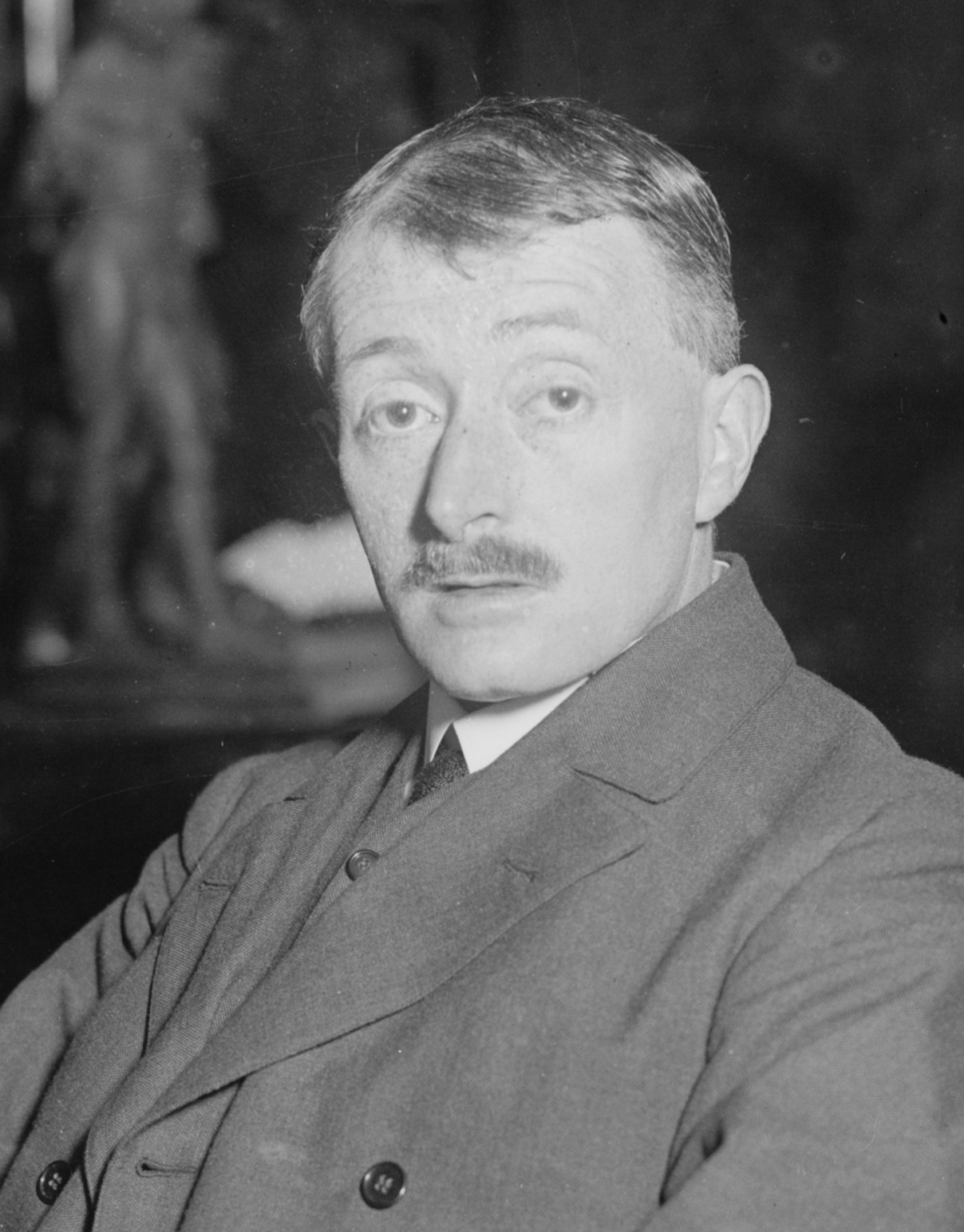
Author John Masefield in 1916

The Old Front Line (ISBN 0-85052-936-0) is a military history book by English poet John Masefield, first published in 1917.

== Book ==
The book is a description of the battlefield front-line from which the British Army attacked on the first day on the Somme, 1 July 1916, and as such is perhaps the first battlefield guide of the First World War. Masefield had originally been asked to write a full account of the Battle of the Somme (in 1916 he had written a successful book on the Battle of Gallipoli) but the project fell through when he was refused access to official army documents. All he was able to produce was his description of the battlefield as seen in 1917 following the German withdrawal to the Hindenburg Line. Nevertheless, The Old Front Line is still frequently referenced today as an eyewitness description of the Somme terrain and it is written with lyrical prose that is rare in books on military history.

Masefield's The Old Front Line is relatively short at about 80 pages. It was reprinted in 1972 with a 70-page summary of the battle, contributed by Colonel Howard Green, MC. The 1972 version included photos of the battlefield taken in 1971, including the Lochnagar mine crater, Delville Wood and the Butte de Warlencourt. A third revision was published in 2003 by Pen & Sword with a preface by Martin Middlebrook.

In 1919 Masefield succeeded in publishing a complete account of the battle as The Battle of the Somme.
