= Ovillers-la-Boisselle =

- Commune
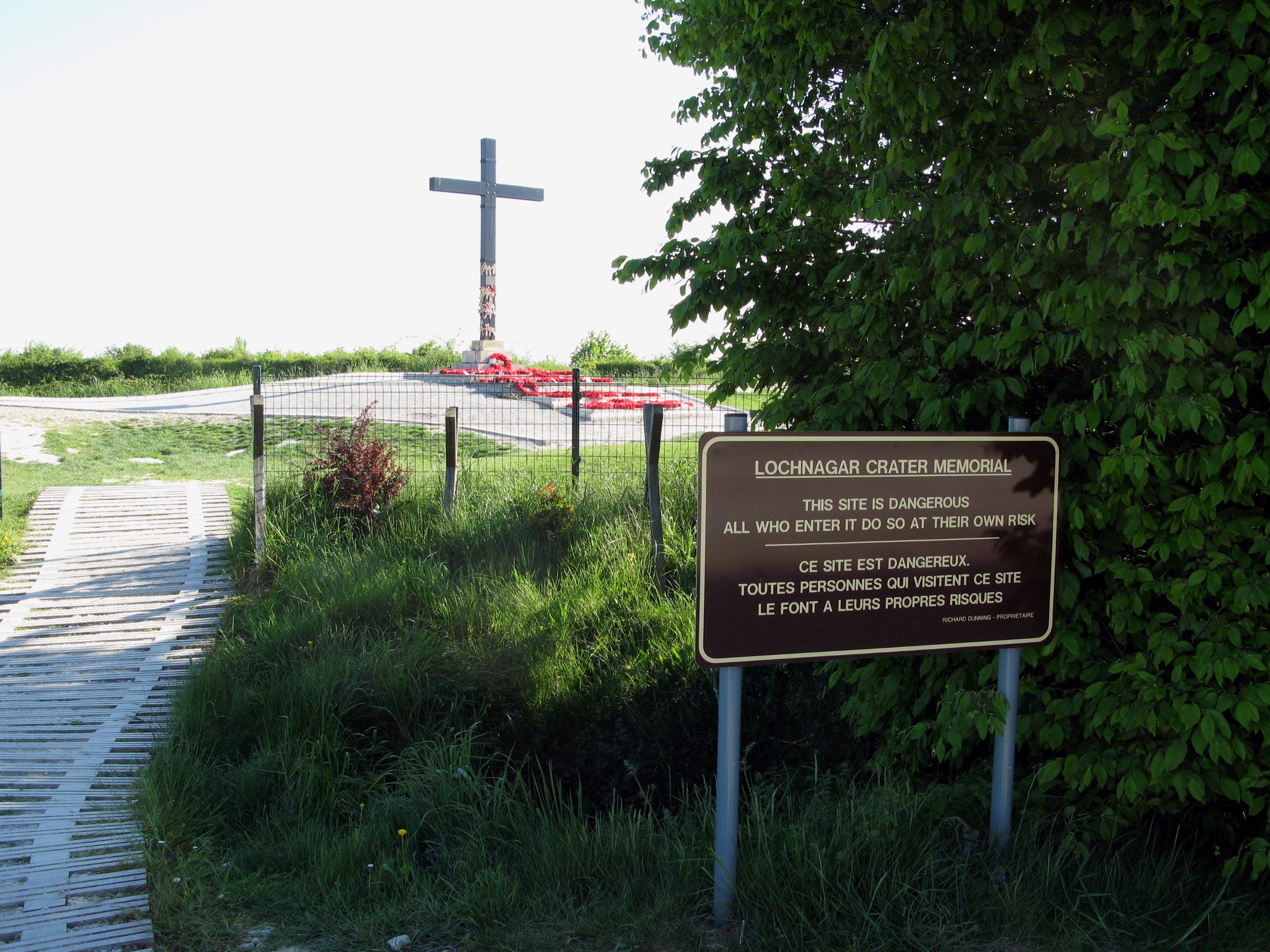
- Lochnagar Crater Memorial

- Coat of arms
- Location of Ovillers-la-Boisselle
- Location within France Location within Hauts-de-France
- Coordinates: 50°01′56″N 2°41′55″E
- Country: France
- Region: Hauts-de-France
- Department: Somme
- Arrondissement: Péronne
- Canton: Albert
- Intercommunality: Pays du Coquelicot

Government
  - Mayor (2020–2026): Christian Bernard
- Area^{1}: 9.61 km^{2} (3.71 sq mi)
- Elevation: 115 m (377 ft)
- Highest elevation: 153 m (502 ft)
- Lowest elevation: 80 m (260 ft)
- Population (2023): 431
  - Density: 44.8/km^{2} (116/sq mi)
- Time zone: UTC+01:00 (CET)
  - Summer (DST): UTC+02:00 (CEST)
- INSEE/Postal code: 80615 /80300
- ^{1} French Land Register data, which excludes lakes, ponds, glaciers > 1 km^{2} (0.386 sq mi or 247 acres) and river estuaries.

Ovillers-la-Boisselle is a commune in the Somme department in Hauts-de-France in northern France.

== Geography ==
The commune of Ovillers-la-Boisselle is situated 22 kilometres (14 mi) northeast of Amiens and extends to the north and south of the D 929 Albert–Bapaume road.

The constituent village of Ovillers-la-Boisselle (commonly shortened to "Ovillers") lies on the north of the D 929 road, north-east of Aveluy and south-west of Pozières.

The constituent village of La Boisselle, which had 35 houses in 1914, lies across the D 929, to the south-west of Ovillers at the junction of the D 104 to Contalmaison.

== Population ==
Historical population
Year	Pop.	±% p.a.
1968	333	—
1975	336	+0.13%
1982	390	+2.15%
1990	392	+0.06%
1999	371	−0.61%
2007	373	+0.07%
2012	443	+3.50%
2017	446	+0.14%
2023	431	−0.57%
Source: INSEE

== History ==
The village of La Boisselle is a settlement dating back to pre-Roman times, and the D 929 Albert–Bapaume road follows the course of a Roman road. During the Franco-Prussian War (1870–1871), the area suffered serious damage after the Battle of Bapaume.

In World War I, the area was the site of intense and sustained fighting between German and Allied forces. Between 1914 and 1916, the Western Front ran through the commune, and its villages were completely destroyed. In 1916, the commune was the site of particularly heavy fighting during the Battle of the Somme (see Ovillers-la-Boisselle in World War I). After the Armistice of 11 November 1918, the former inhabitants returned and gradually rebuilt most of the infrastructure as it had been before the war.

In 2011, British researchers around Peter Barton started the La Boisselle Project, a long-term archaeological, historical, technological and genealogical study with special focus on L'îlot de La Boisselle, a 3.12-hectare (7.7-acre) historic site on the south-western tip of La Boisselle which was known during World War I as L'îlot to the French, Granathof to the Germans and Glory Hole to the British. The site still holds mine craters as well as traces of trenches, shelters and tunnels related to underground warfare, but is private property and not open to the public.

== Places of interest ==
- Ovillers British Military Cemetery
- The Gordon Dump Cemetery
- Lochnagar Crater, one of the sites of the mines exploded on the first day of the Battle of the Somme.
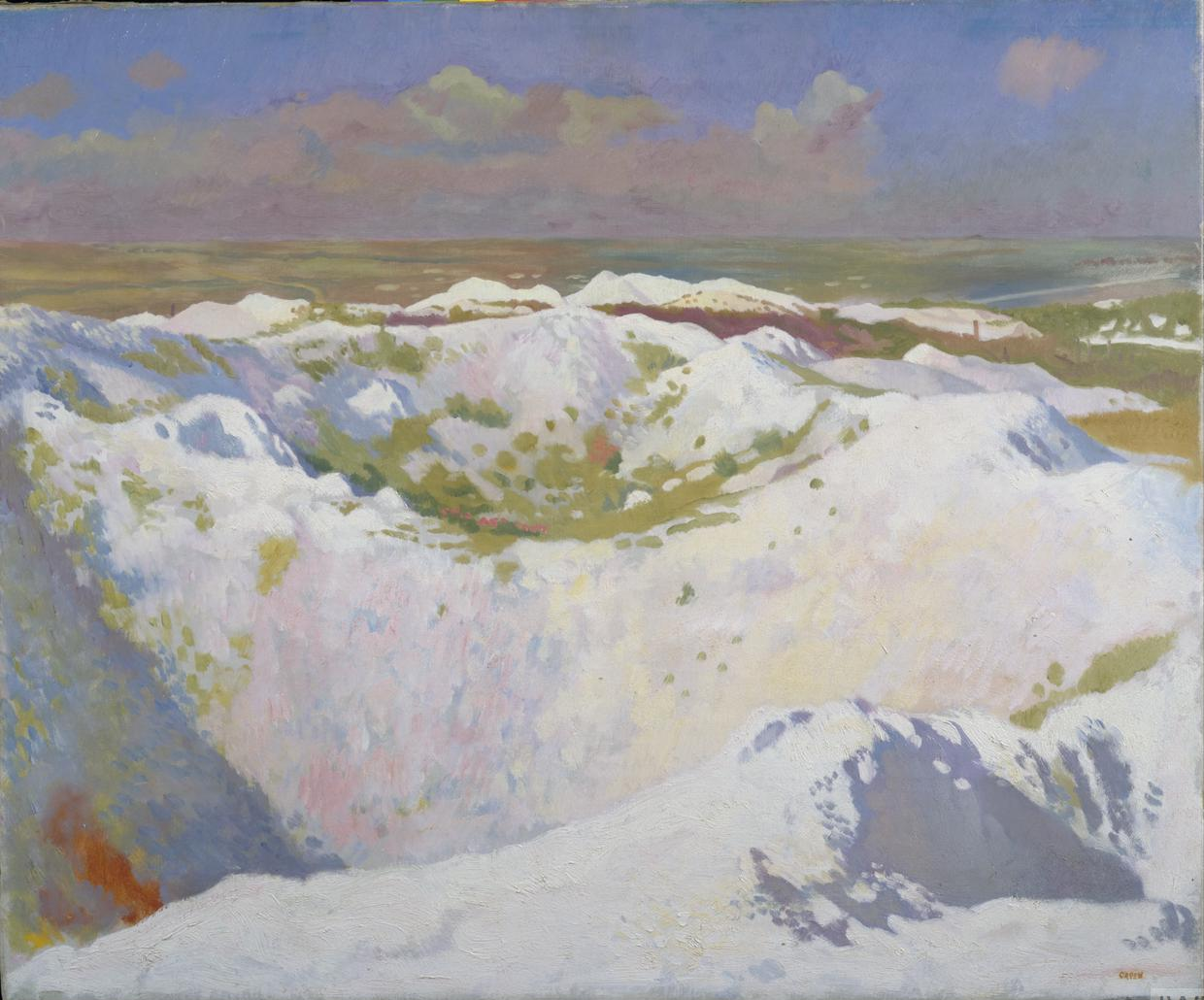
William Orpen: Mines and the Bapaume Road, La Boisselle

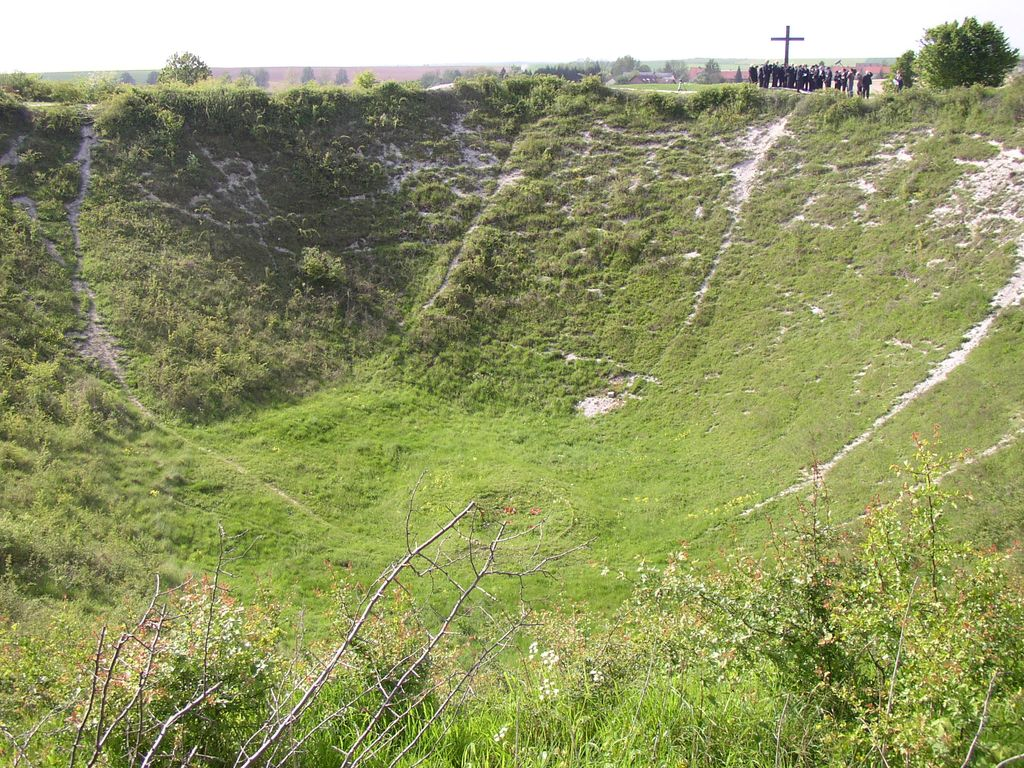
Lochnagar Crater, October 2005

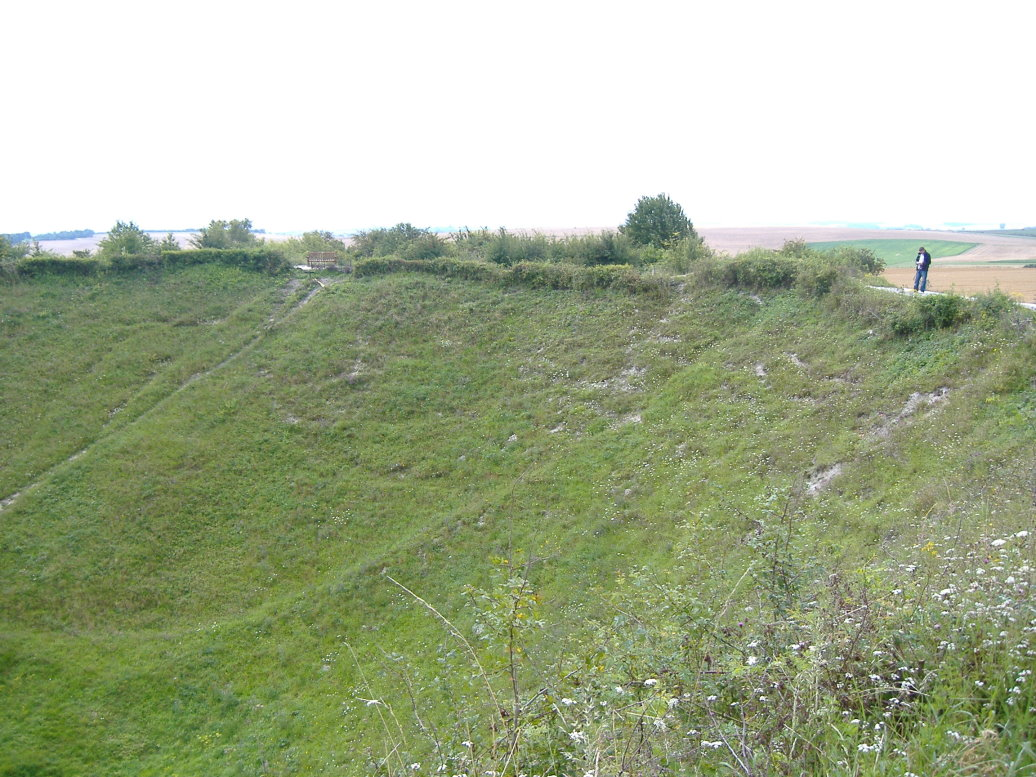
Lochnagar Crater, August 2006

== See also ==
- Communes of the Somme department
- Sausage Valley
- Capture of Ovillers
- Capture of La Boisselle
- L'îlot de La Boisselle
