= Tamper (tool) =

Tool used in construction for flattening

Video of construction workers ramming a road surface

A tamper is a device used to compact or flatten aggregate materials, or other sorts of powdered or granular material, usually to make it resistant to further compression, or to increase its density.

== Examples ==
- Small, handheld tampers are used to compress ground coffee into a puck to prepare espresso.

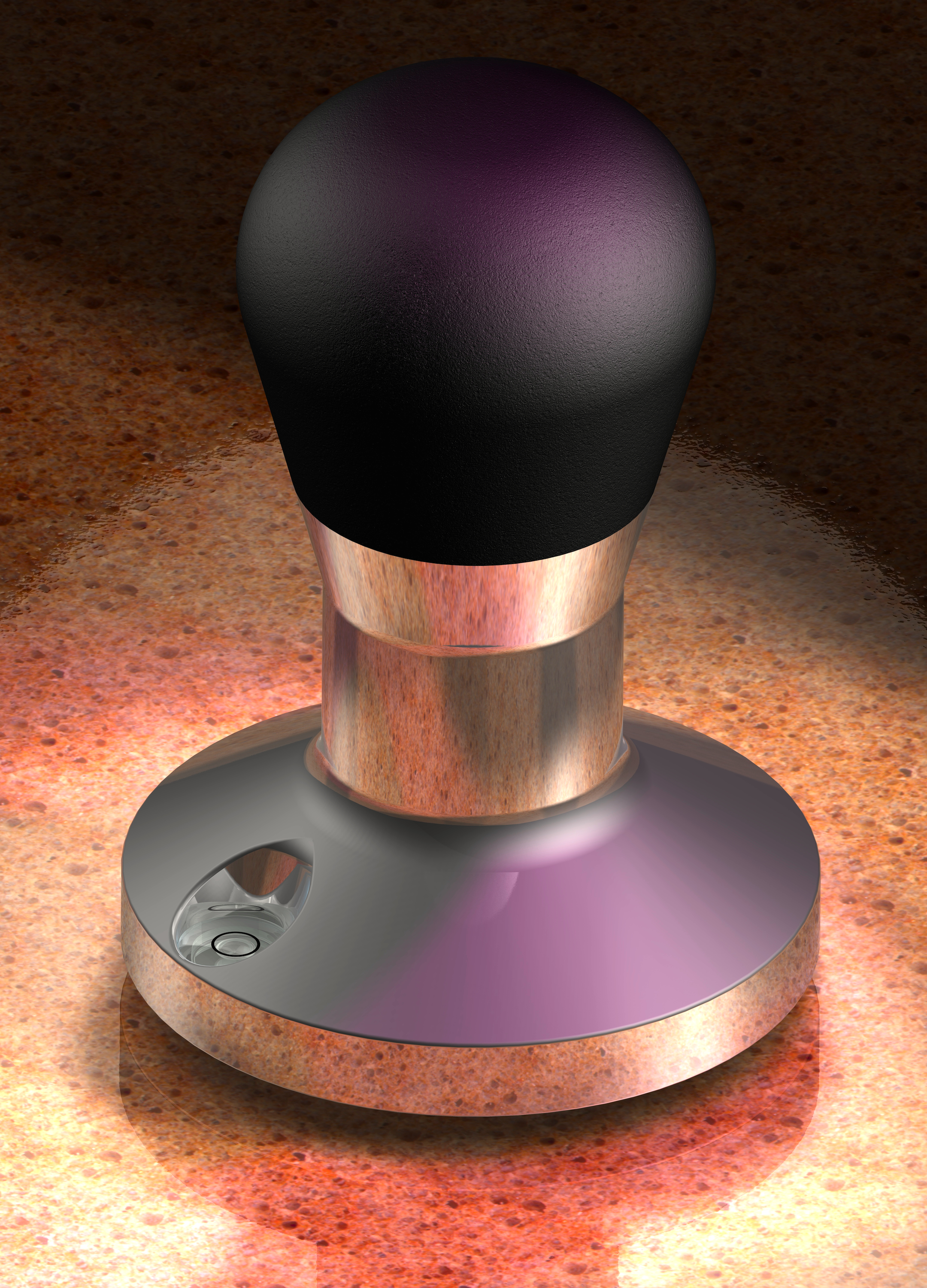
A fancy coffee tamper

- Manual or powered tampers compact gravel before laying a concrete or brick patio or walkway, so that the underlying gravel layer neither settles over time, nor compresses the fill in a utility trench, as seen in the illustration.
- Self-propelled, mechanised ballast tamping machines, which compact the ballast underneath rail tracks.
- Some firearms and artillery pieces might require preparations for firing that may involve tamping the charge, such as explosive material or a projectile, into the barrel. For example, muzzle loaders.
- A fireplace can be tamped with a poker or similar tool to compress the material being burned (for example, wood, coal, peat, and so forth...). This improves the heat/burning efficiency, by reducing the volume of burning material that is exposed to airflow. This is not to be confused with damping, which involves reducing the intensity of the burn by restricting the flue, or by the use of fire-retarding material (such as water).

=== Tampers in construction ===
Within the construction field, different types of tampers can be used for different purposes, spaces, and materials. For example:

- A jumping jack, or rammer, is a relatively small, hand-operated compactor. It uses vibratory force; that is, mechanical force is used in addition to the machine's weight to compact the materials. The jumping jack is composed of a motor, handle, and head. When the motor is started, the head is moved up and down, and the operator steers the machine around the desired area. Jumping jacks work well in small areas and are good for cohesive soil, or soil with a large clay content. The video shows a jumping jack being used in construction to prepare for paving.
- A plate compactor, or plate tamp, is another hand-operated compactor that also uses vibratory force. The plate compactor consists of a handle and head that holds the motor. When started, the plate moves up and down within the head, and the operator pushes the compactor around the desired area. Plate compactors work best with granular soils, such as gravel and sand. They come in a variety of sizes due to the flexibility of the push motion. Vibratory plate compactors are the lightest and best for smaller projects, while heavy-duty plate compactors exert the most force and work well for large-scale projects, such as paving.
- A handheld tamper is a small compactor that utilizes static force, which is when only the dead weight of the equipment and pressure the operator applies to it compact the materials. These tampers do not have a motor, only a flat plate attached to a handle. The plate is placed on the material the operator wishes to compact, then pressed down. Handheld tampers are best used with soil and other small-scale projects, due to the lack of great force from mechanical elements.

== See also ==
- Compactor
- Sand rammer
