= Military designation of days and hours =

NATO STANAG military term

NATO designations are specified in Allied Administrative Publication AAP-6 (STANAG 3680) NATO Glossary of Terms and Definitions, and marked (NATO) in this list. Entries specific to the U.S. and defined only in Joint Publication JP 1-02 are marked (US).

Times relative to the designation are indicated with +/−[Arabic numeral] after the letter, replacing -day or -hour with a count of the same unit: "D−1" (the day before D-Day), "L+9" (9 hours after L-Hour) etc. In less formal contexts, the symbol or numeral may be spelled out: "D minus 1" or "L plus nine."

A-Day
20 October 1944, the day the Leyte Island Operation began.
C-Day
Short for "Commencement Day" which usually means when deployment for an operation commences. It is called "Candy Day" because before deployment candy is usually passed out to G.I.s from charitable organizations. (US)
D-Day

The unnamed day on which an operation commences or is due to commence. The most famous D-Day was 6 June 1944, when "Operation Overlord" began. (NATO). The "D" may stand for "Day".
E-Day
The unnamed day on which a NATO exercise commences. (NATO)
F-Hour
The effective time of announcement by the U.S. Secretary of Defense to the Military Departments of a decision to mobilize Reserve units. (US)
G-Day
The unnamed day on which an order, normally national, is given to deploy a unit. (NATO)
H-Hour

The specific time at which an operation or exercise commences, or is due to commence (this term is used also as a reference for the designation of days/hours before or after the event). (NATO); also known as 'Zero Hour'.
I-Day
Used informally within the U.S. military bureaucracy to variously designate the "Implementation Day" or the (Delivery Order) "Issuance Day".
J-Day
Used during both World Wars to designate the day an assault occurred.
K-Day
The unnamed day on which a convoy system is introduced or is due to be introduced on any particular convoy lane. (NATO)
L-Hour
The specific time at which deployment for an operation commences. (US)
L-Day
For "Landing Day", 1 April 1945, the day Operation Iceberg (the invasion of Okinawa) began.
M-Day
The day on which mobilization commences or is due to commence. (NATO)
N-Day
The unnamed day an active duty unit is notified for deployment or redeployment. (US)
O-Day
A Maritime Prepositioning Force (MPF, the vanguard of a Marine Air-Ground Task Force, MAGTF) term designating the day the Maritime Propositioning Ship Squadron (MPSRON) off-load begins, or the continuous flow of the Fly-In Echelon (FIE) commences, whichever is later.
P-Day
The expected date at which the rate of production of a consumable equals the rate at which the item is required by the Armed Forces. (US)
Q-Day
23 June 1945, the day of the dress rehearsal of the first atom bomb test; nowadays it is sometimes used informally to mean "Quality Day", or the first day of the calendar quarter.
R-Day
The unnamed day on which redeployment of major combat, combat support, and combat service support forces begins in an operation. (US)
S-Day
The unnamed day the President authorizes Selective Reserve callup (not more than 200,000 men). (US)
T-Day
The effective day coincident with Presidential declaration of national emergency and authorization of partial mobilization (not more than 1,000,000 personnel exclusive of the 200,000 callup). (US)
V-Day
Sometimes used to designate "Victory Day", the day an operation successfully concludes.
V-E Day
"Victory in Europe"; designates 8 May 1945, the date when the Allies formally celebrated the defeat of Nazi Germany.
V-J Day
"Victory over Japan"; designates 14 August 1945, the date of Japan's unconditional surrender.
Otherwise VP Day in Australian usage.
W-Day
The effective day the President takes the adversary decision to prepare for war (unambiguous strategic warning). (US)
X-Day
1 November 1945, the day Operation Downfall (the invasion of Japan) was to begin. The term also generically means "attack day".
Y-Day
1 March 1946, the day Operation Coronet (the invasion of Tokyo Plains) was to occur.
Z-Day
10 June 1945, the day the Australian Imperial Forces landed in Brunei Bay to liberate Brunei, part of Operation Oboe Six.
