= George Woolley (footballer) =

English footballer (1877–1917)

Personal information
- Full name: George Arthur Woolley
- Date of birth: 1877
- Place of birth: Langley Mill, England
- Date of death: 22 July 1917 (aged 39–40)
- Place of death: Hooge, Belgium
- Position: Goalkeeper

Senior career*
Years	Team	Apps	(Gls)
- Ilkeston Town
- Staveley
1901–1902	Chesterfield Town	4	(0)
- Ilkeston Town
- * Club domestic league appearances and goals

George Arthur Woolley (1877 – 22 July 1917) was an English footballer who played as a goalkeeper in the Football League for Chesterfield Town.

== Personal life ==
Prior to the First World War, Woolley worked as a miner in Codnor and Pinxton. At the outbreak of the war, he enlisted in the Sherwood Foresters; due to his profession, he was transferred to the Royal Engineers and joined the 177th Tunnelling Company. He was severely wounded in May 1915, but recovered and returned to his company, which was positioned at Railway Wood, Hooge. On 22 July 1917, Corporal Woolley was supervising a dugout when gas shells hit the position. He went inside the dugout to assist other soldiers, but was killed in the process of doing so. Woolley is commemorated on a memorial at the RE Grave, Railway Wood.

== Career statistics ==
Appearances and goals by club, season and competition
Club	Season	Division	League		FA Cup		Total	
Club	Season	Division	Apps	Goals	Apps	Goals	Apps	Goals
Chesterfield Town	1901–02	Second Division	4	0	0	0	4	0
Career total			4	0	0	0	4	0
