= 1st Australian Tunnelling Company =

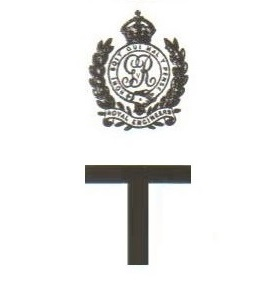
- Active: 1916–19
- Country: Australia
- Branch: Australian Imperial Force
- Type: Royal Engineer tunnelling company
- Role: Military engineering Tunnel warfare
- Nickname: "The Diggers"
- Engagements: World War I: Hill 60; Battle of Messines

Commanders
- Notable commanders: Oliver Woodward

The 1st Australian Tunnelling Company was one of the tunnelling companies of the Royal Australian Engineers during World War I. The tunnelling units were occupied in offensive and defensive mining involving the placing and maintaining of mines under enemy lines, as well as other underground work such as the construction of deep dugouts for troop accommodation, the digging of subways, saps (narrow trenches dug to approach enemy trenches), cable trenches, and underground chambers for signals and medical services.

== Background ==
By January 1915 it had become evident to the BEF at the Western Front that the Germans were mining to a planned system. As the British had failed to develop suitable counter-tactics or underground listening devices before the war, field marshals French and Kitchener agreed to investigate the suitability of forming British mining units. Following consultations between the Engineer-in-Chief of the BEF, Brigadier George Fowke, and the mining specialist John Norton-Griffiths, the War Office formally approved the tunnelling company scheme on 19 February 1915.

Norton-Griffiths ensured that tunnelling companies numbers 170 to 177 were ready for deployment in mid-February 1915. In the spring of that year, there was constant underground fighting in the Ypres Salient at Hooge, Hill 60, Railway Wood, Sanctuary Wood, St Eloi and The Bluff which required the deployment of new drafts of tunnellers for several months after the formation of the first eight companies. The lack of suitably experienced men led to some tunnelling companies starting work later than others. The number of units available to the BEF was also restricted by the need to provide effective counter-measures to the German mining activities. To make the tunnels safer and quicker to deploy, the British Army enlisted experienced coal miners, many outside their nominal recruitment policy. The first nine companies, numbers 170 to 178, were each commanded by a regular Royal Engineers officer. These companies each comprised 5 officers and 269 sappers; they were aided by additional infantrymen who were temporarily attached to the tunnellers as required, which almost doubled their numbers. The success of the first tunnelling companies formed under Norton-Griffiths' command led to mining being made a separate branch of the Engineer-in-Chief's office under Major-General S.R. Rice, and the appointment of an 'Inspector of Mines' at the GHQ Saint-Omer office of the Engineer-in-Chief. A second group of tunnelling companies were formed from Welsh miners from the 1st and 3rd Battalions of the Monmouthshire Regiment, who were attached to the 1st Northumberland Field Company of the Royal Engineers, which was a Territorial unit. The formation of twelve new tunnelling companies, between July and October 1915, helped to bring more men into action in other parts of the Western Front. Most British tunnelling companies were formed under Norton-Griffiths' leadership during 1915, and one more was added in 1916.

On 10 September 1915, the British government sent an appeal to Canada, South Africa, Australia and New Zealand to raise tunnelling companies in the Dominions of the British Empire. On 17 September, New Zealand became the first Dominion to agree the formation of a tunnelling unit. The New Zealand Tunnelling Company arrived at Plymouth on 3 February 1916 and was deployed to the Western Front in northern France. The Royal Australian Engineers formed four mining units – initially grouped into the Australian Mining Corps – for the British Expeditionary Force, all of which were operational by March 1916. Three were specialist companies of tunnellers (1st, 2nd, 3rd), while the Australian Electrical Mechanical Boring and Mining Company was tasked with carrying out related repairs. A Canadian tunnelling unit was formed from men on the battlefield, plus two other companies trained in Canada and then shipped to France, resulting in 30 tunnelling companies being available by the summer of 1916.

== Unit history ==
=== Formation ===
In early 1915, while the Royal Australian Engineers were deployed in Egypt, the battalion-sized "Australian Mining Corps" was assembled from men with a background in civilian mining. The intention was to employ this unit, which was at that time about 1,000 strong, with the ANZAC at Gallipoli, but instead it was moved to France in May 1916, where it also appeared as the "Australian Mining Battalion". Soon after arriving in western Europe in May 1916, the battalion was split into three tunnelling and one repairs company, and the corps headquarters dissolved.

=== Hooge ===
Shortly after its formation, the 1st Australian Tunnelling Company relieved the British 175th Tunnelling Company in May 1916 in the Railway Wood-Hooge-Armagh Wood area of the Ypres Salient.

=== Hill 60/Messines ===
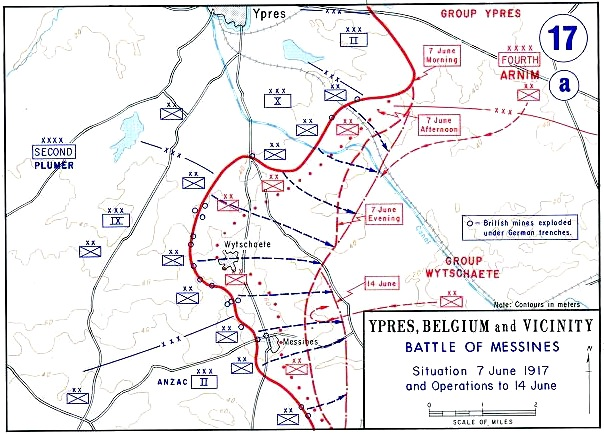
Map of the mines laid before the Battle of Messines, 1917

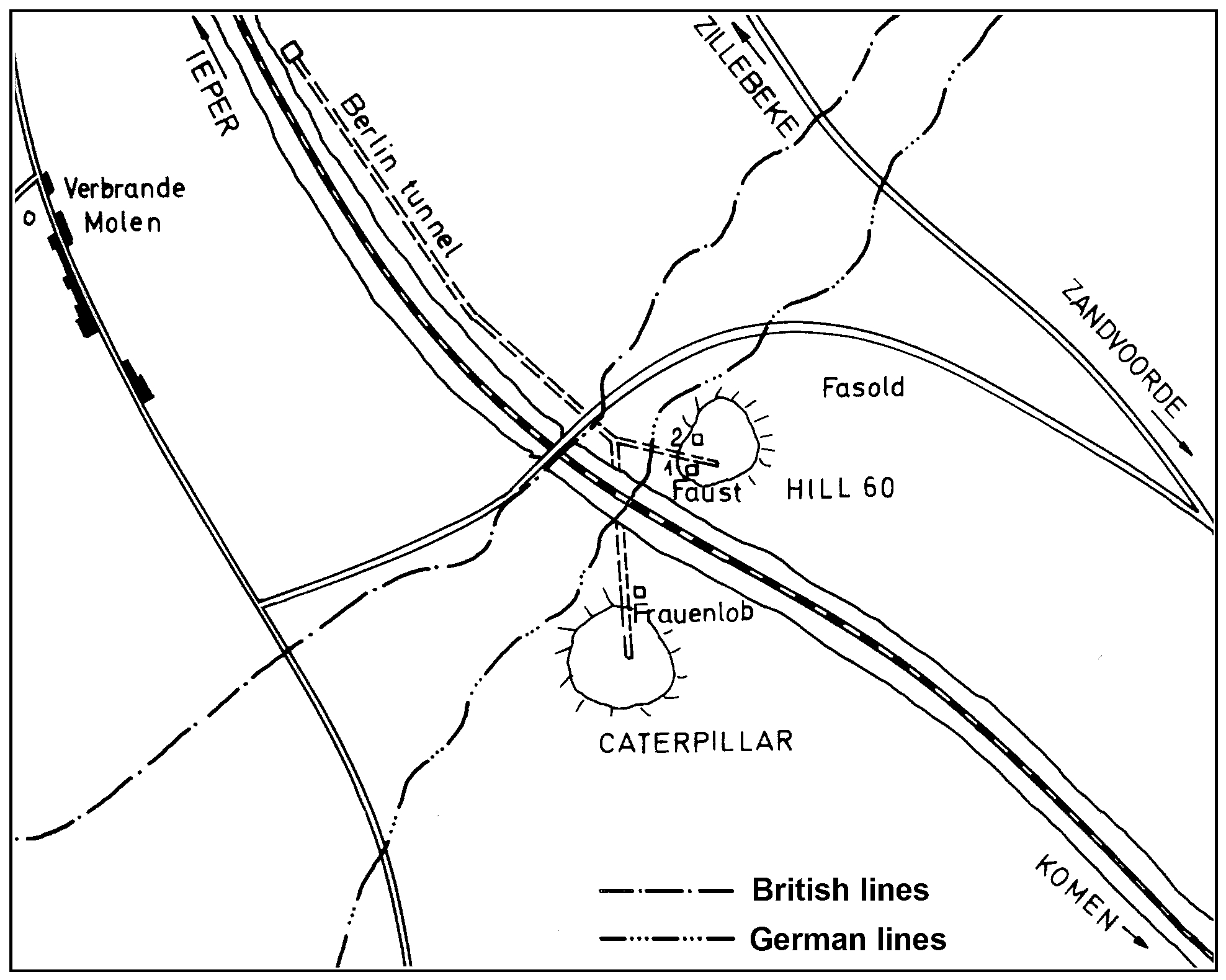
Plan of the two deep mines placed at Hill 60 before the Battle of Messines

On 7 November 1916, the 1st Australian Tunnelling Company took over the mines at Hill 60 from the 1st and 3rd Canadian tunnelling companies. The mines placed under the German lines by the 3rd Canadian Tunnelling Company had already been charged with explosives by the time the Australians arrived in the area. The first mine (Hill 60) contained 53,000 pounds (24,000 kg) of ammonal explosive and the second (The Caterpillar) contained 70,000 pounds (32,000 kg). The galleries formed part of the series of mines that was dug by the British 171st, 175th, 250th, 1st Canadian, 3rd Canadian and 1st Australian Tunnelling companies as part of the prelude to the Battle of Messines (7–14 June 1917), while the British 183rd, 2nd Canadian and 2nd Australian Tunnelling companies built deep dugouts (underground shelters) in the Second Army area.

As part of the preparations for the Battle of Messines, the 1st Australian Tunnelling Company was tasked with ensuring that the tunnels and explosives beneath Hill 60 and The Caterpillar remained intact and undiscovered by the Germans over the next seven months. Drainage and ventilation shafts had to be dug in the unfamiliar blue clay, and there was a constant danger of collapse, particularly in the part of the gallery leading to The Caterpillar, which passed under the railway line. At the same time, listening posts had to be maintained to detect enemy action. These posts were only a few metres underground and therefore susceptible to collapse during bombardments. The German mining units were constantly trying to find British tunnels and numerous counter tunnels had to be dug towards the German excavations so that they could be mined with small charges and destroyed. In April 1917, German infantry conducted a raid into the British lines in an attempt to find the entrances to the British mine galleries but failed to do so. On 25 April 1917, a detonator exploded in the Australian underground HQ, killing ten men. The Official Australian History states that at Hill 60, "underground warfare reached a tension which was not surpassed anywhere else on the British front". It is estimated that altogether approximately thirty Australian tunnellers were killed at Hill 60. The mines at Messines were eventually detonated on 7 June 1917, creating 19 large craters.

=== Hill 63/Ploegsteert ===
The 1st Australian Tunnelling Company also undertook work on the Catacombs inside Hill 63 at Ploegsteert.

== Memorial ==
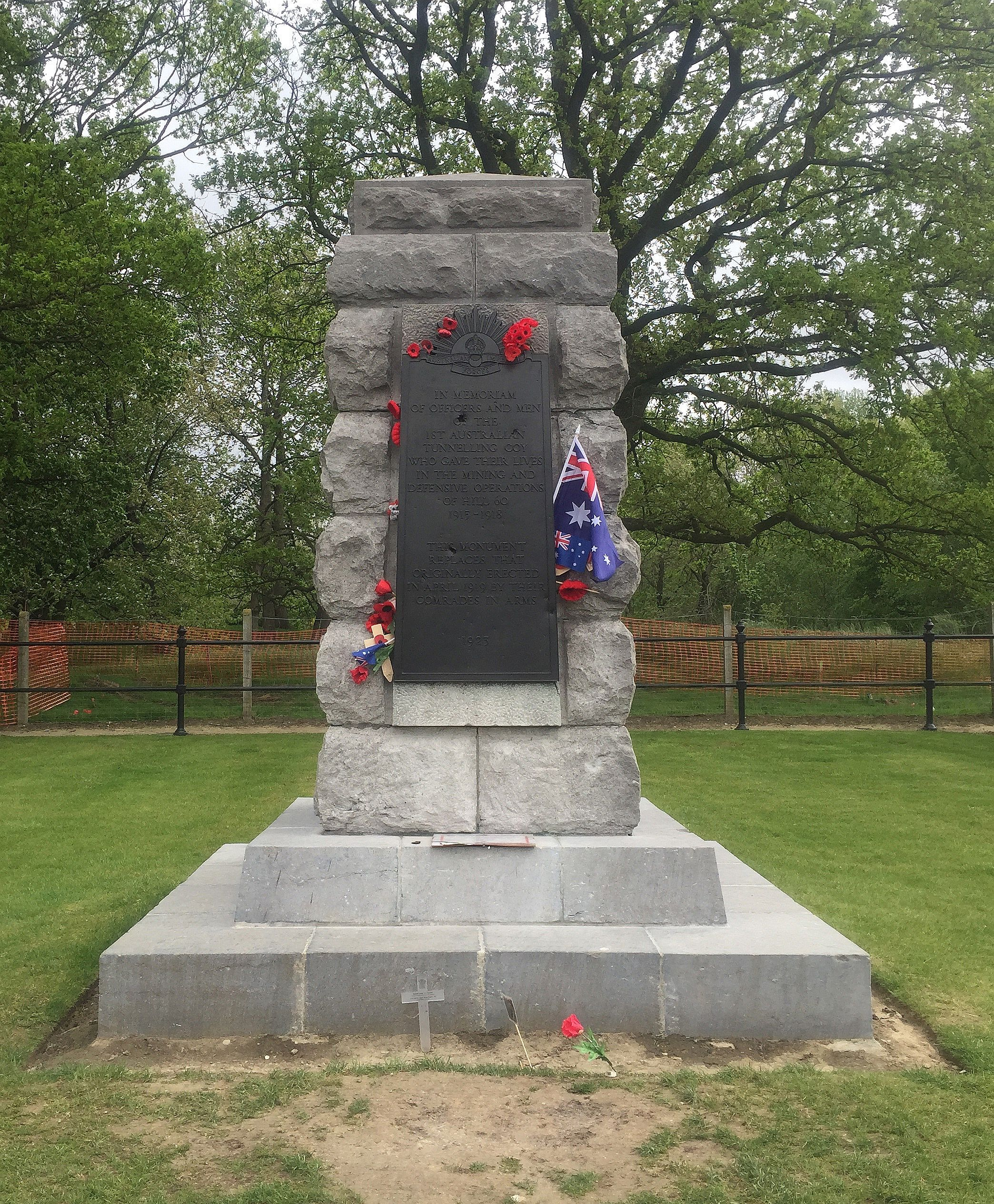
Hill 60, 1st Australian Tunnelling Company Memorial

There is a memorial to the 1st Australian Tunnelling Company at the Hill 60 Memorial Park at Zillebeke. The current memorial was inaugurated in 1923 and replaces an earlier structure, which had been erected by the tunnellers themselves in 1919. The brass plaque on the front of the memorial bears an inscription and several bullet holes from the Second World War. The memorial is located next to the entrance gate of the Hill 60 Battlefield Memorial Park. The inscription reads:

IN MEMORIAM OF OFFICERS AND MEN OF THE 1ST AUSTRALIAN TUNNELLING COY WHO GAVE THEIR LIVES IN THE MINING AND DEFENSIVE OPERATIONS OF HILL 60 1915-1918 / THIS MONUMENT REPLACES THAT ORIGINALLY ERECTED IN APRIL 1919 BY THEIR COMRADES IN ARMS / 1923

== Notable members ==
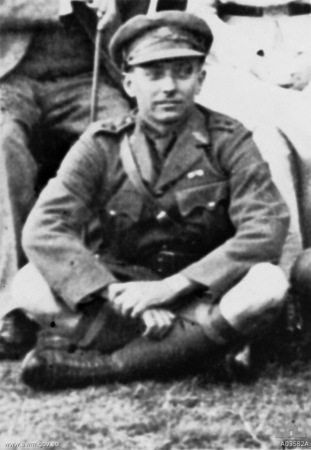
Captain Oliver Woodward, 1st Australian Tunnelling Company, c. 1917

- Captain Oliver Woodward CMG, MC & Two Bars (1885–1966)

== Popular culture ==
- Beneath Hill 60: a 2010 Australian war film, directed by Jeremy Sims and written by David Roach, tells the story of the 1st Australian Tunnelling Company. The screenplay is based on an account of the ordeal written by Captain Oliver Woodward, who is portrayed by Brendan Cowell.

== See also ==
- Mine warfare
