= 177th Tunnelling Company =

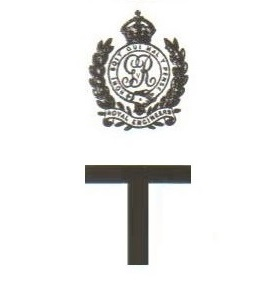
- Active: World War I
- Country: United Kingdom
- Branch: British Army
- Type: Royal Engineer tunnelling company
- Role: military engineering, tunnel warfare
- Nickname: "The Moles"
- Engagements: World War I Hooge

The 177th Tunnelling Company was one of the tunnelling companies of the Royal Engineers created by the British Army during World War I. The tunnelling units were occupied in offensive and defensive mining involving the placing and maintaining of mines under enemy lines, as well as other underground work such as the construction of deep dugouts for troop accommodation, the digging of subways, saps (a narrow trench dug to approach enemy trenches), cable trenches and underground chambers for signals and medical services.

== Background ==
By January 1915 it had become evident to the BEF at the Western Front that the Germans were mining to a planned system. As the British had failed to develop suitable counter-tactics or underground listening devices before the war, field marshals French and Kitchener agreed to investigate the suitability of forming British mining units. Following consultations between the Engineer-in-Chief of the BEF, Brigadier George Fowke, and the mining specialist John Norton-Griffiths, the War Office formally approved the tunnelling company scheme on 19 February 1915.

Norton-Griffiths ensured that tunnelling companies numbers 170 to 177 were ready for deployment in mid-February 1915. In the spring of that year, there was constant underground fighting in the Ypres Salient at Hooge, Hill 60, Railway Wood, Sanctuary Wood, St Eloi and The Bluff which required the deployment of new drafts of tunnellers for several months after the formation of the first eight companies. The lack of suitably experienced men led to some tunnelling companies starting work later than others. The number of units available to the BEF was also restricted by the need to provide effective counter-measures to the German mining activities. To make the tunnels safer and quicker to deploy, the British Army enlisted experienced coal miners, many outside their nominal recruitment policy. The first nine companies, numbers 170 to 178, were each commanded by a regular Royal Engineers officer. These companies each comprised 5 officers and 269 sappers; they were aided by additional infantrymen who were temporarily attached to the tunnellers as required, which almost doubled their numbers. The success of the first tunnelling companies formed under Norton-Griffiths' command led to mining being made a separate branch of the Engineer-in-Chief's office under Major-General S.R. Rice, and the appointment of an 'Inspector of Mines' at the GHQ Saint-Omer office of the Engineer-in-Chief. A second group of tunnelling companies were formed from Welsh miners from the 1st and 3rd Battalions of the Monmouthshire Regiment, who were attached to the 1st Northumberland Field Company of the Royal Engineers, which was a Territorial unit. The formation of twelve new tunnelling companies, between July and October 1915, helped to bring more men into action in other parts of the Western Front.

Most tunnelling companies were formed under Norton-Griffiths' leadership during 1915, and one more was added in 1916. On 10 September 1915, the British government sent an appeal to Canada, South Africa, Australia and New Zealand to raise tunnelling companies in the Dominions of the British Empire. On 17 September, New Zealand became the first Dominion to agree the formation of a tunnelling unit. The New Zealand Tunnelling Company arrived at Plymouth on 3 February 1916 and was deployed to the Western Front in northern France. A Canadian unit was formed from men on the battlefield, plus two other companies trained in Canada and then shipped to France. Three Australian tunnelling companies were formed by March 1916, resulting in 30 tunnelling companies of the Royal Engineers being available by the summer of 1916.

== Unit history ==
177th Tunnelling Company was formed at Terdeghem in June 1915, and moved into the Ypres Salient into a wide area facing Wijtschate. From its formation until after the end of the war the company served under Third Army.

=== St Eloi ===
Mining activity by the tunnelling companies of the Royal Engineers at St Eloi had begun in early 1915. The Germans exploded mines under the area known as The Mound just south-east of St Eloi in March 1915 and in the ensuing fighting the British suffered some 500 casualties. A month later, on 14 April 1915, the Germans fired another mine producing a crater over 20 metres (66 ft) in diameter. Much of the British tunnelling in this sector was done by the 177th and the 172nd Tunnelling Company. Mining and counter-mining at St Eloi continued at a pace until the Battle of Messines.

=== Menin Gate Dugouts ===
In autumn 1915, the 177th Tunnelling Company moved into Ypres itself, where it built tunnelled dugouts in the city ramparts near the Menin Gate from September to November 1915. These were the first British tunnelled dugouts in the Ypres Salient.

=== Hooge 1915 – 1917 ===
Soon after the Menin Gate Dugouts had got underway, the 177th Tunnelling Company left the city and moved to the front line at Hooge to build new dugouts beneath the Menin Road. Between November 1915 and August 1917, the unit was stationed in the Railway Wood-Hooge-Armagh Wood area of the Ypres Salient, where it was engaged in mining activities against the Germans on the Bellewaerde Ridge near Zillebeke.

The area at Hooge where the old Ypres-Roeselare railway crossed the Ypres-Menen road belonged to one of the easternmost sectors of the salient and was the site of intense and sustained fighting between German and Allied forces for much of the war. In the Hooge sector, the opposing front lines were almost within whispering distance of each other. With its ruined village and a maze of battered and confusing trench lines, the area was regarded as the hotspot for the infantry, where snipers abounded and trench raids were frequent. Both sides saw Hooge as a particularly important area and a key target for heavy artillery bombardment. British and German army engineers attempted to break the stalemate of trench warfare by tunneling under no man's land and laying large quantities of explosives beneath the enemy's trenches.

Major S. H. Cowan, commanding officer of 175th Tunnelling Company, described the situation at Hooge in June 1915: "There is some urgent [mining] work to be done at once in a village on a main road east of Ypres. We hold one half and the job is to get the G[ermans] out of the other, failing that they may get us out and so obtain another hill top from which to overlook the land. It is a significant fact that all their recent attacks round Ypres have been directed on hill tops and have rested content on the same, without trying really hard to advance down the slopes towards us." Cowan's unit fired a large mine on 19 July 1915, enabling the British infantry to take Hooge, but on 30 July, the Germans took back all and more of the ground they had lost.

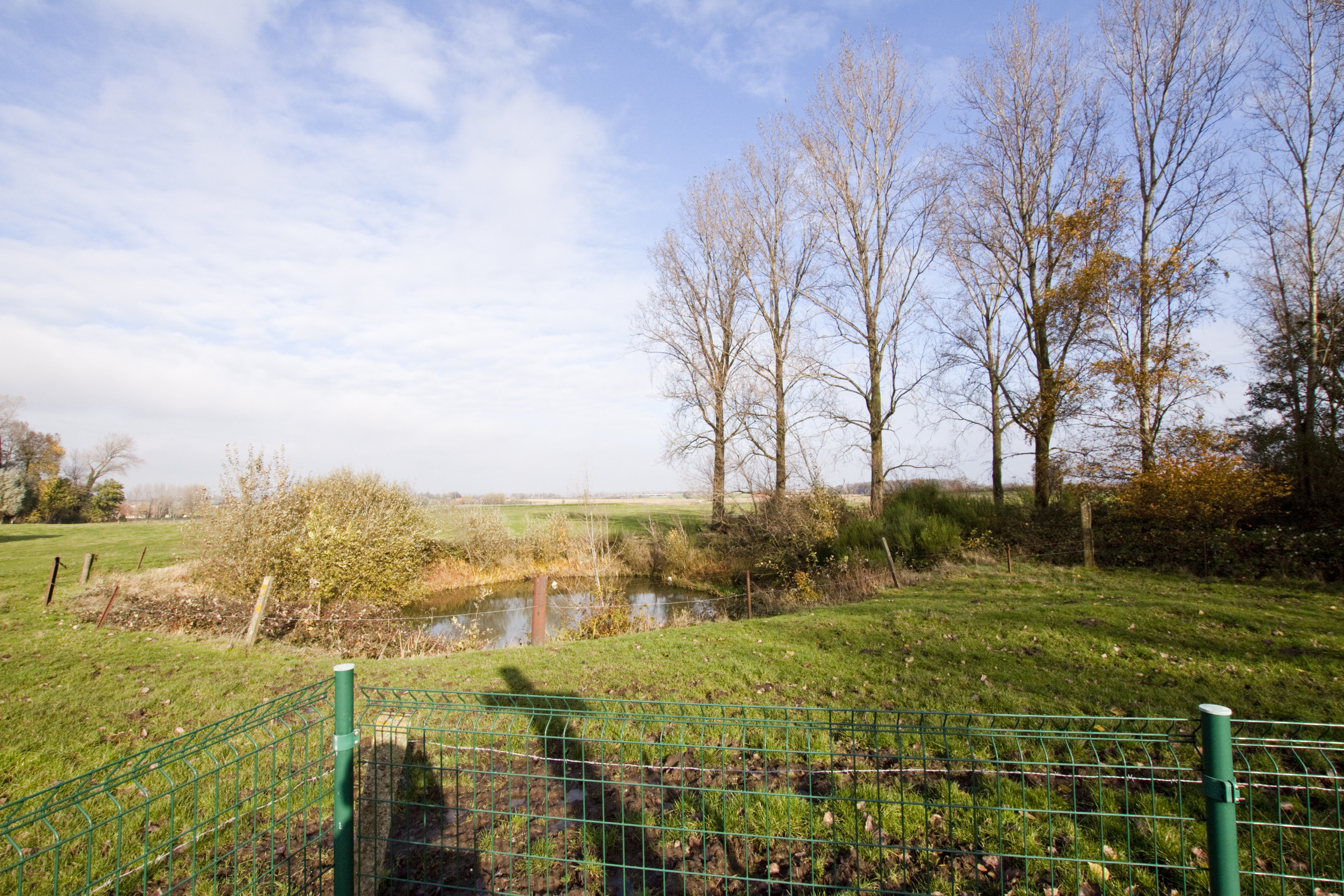
Mine crater at Railway Wood near Hooge, located just behind the Royal Engineers' grave

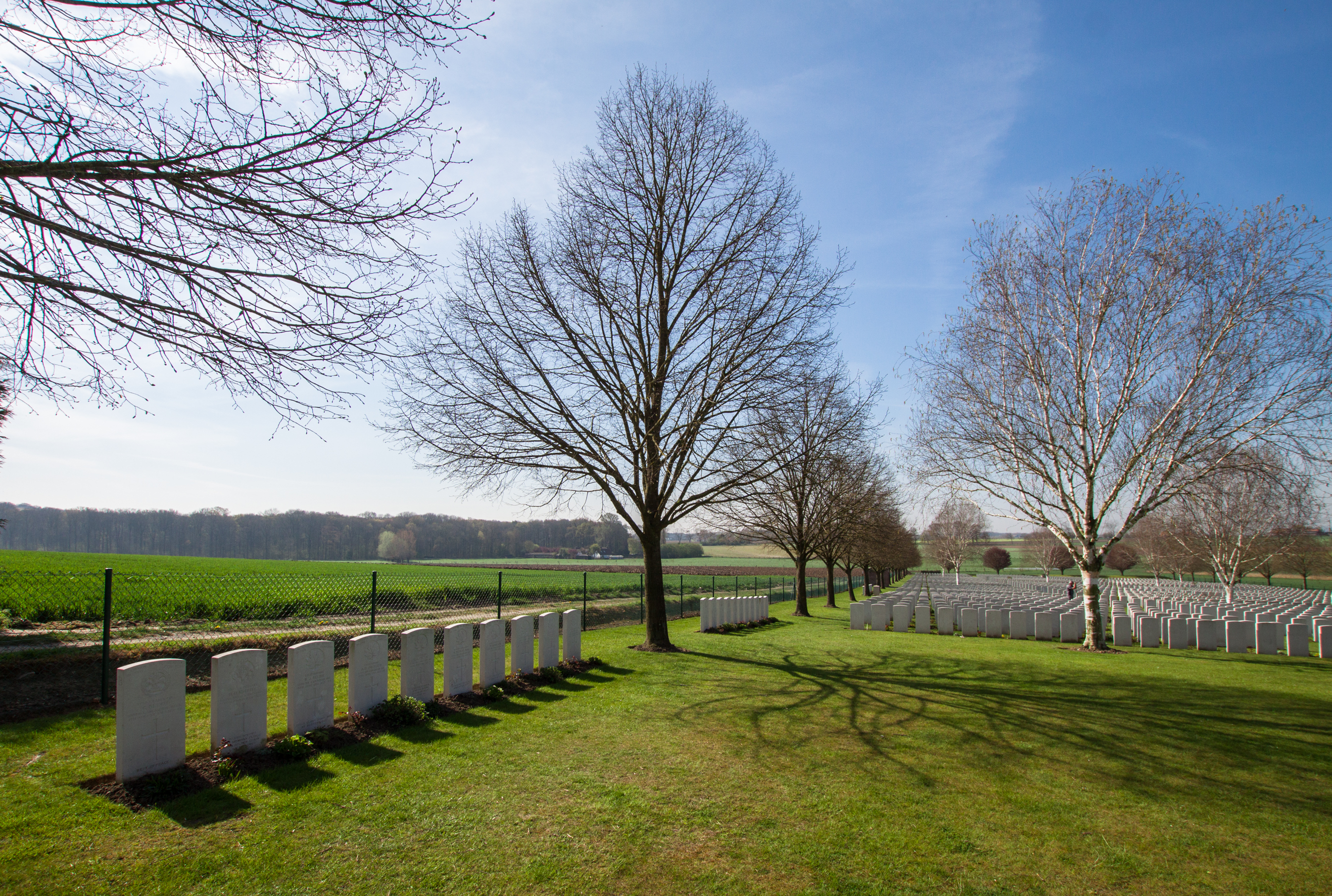
Section of Hooge Crater Cemetery with location of a deep dugout made by 177th Tunnelling Company

When 177th Tunnelling Company arrived in November 1915, underground warfare at Hooge was far from over. Aerial photographs clearly show the proliferation of mine warfare in the Railway Wood sector during the unit's presence there, with craters lying almost exclusively in no man's land between the British and German trenches. With both sides trying to undermine their enemy, much of 177th Tunnelling Company's activity at Railway Wood consisted of creating and maintaining a shallow fighting system with camouflets, a deeper defensive system as well as offensive galleries from an underground shaft. On the morning of 28 April 1916, a German camouflet killed three men of 177th Tunnelling Company, including Lieutenant C. G. Boothby (see below). In June 1916 the Germans blew three charges close to 175th Tunnelling Company's crater of July 1915, planned as part of a surprise offensive which captured the ruins of Hooge village as well as the neighbouring Observatory Ridge and Sanctuary Wood - the only high ground on British hands in the whole of the Ypres Salient. Canadian units later regained Observatory Ridge and Sanctuary Wood, but not Hooge.

While tunnelling at Hooge during the defence of Ypres, the 177th Tunnelling Company also built a forward accommodation scheme in the Cambridge Road sector along the rear edge of Railway Wood, halfway in between Wieltje and Hooge. The Cambridge Road dugout system was located within 100 metres (110 yd) of the front line. It was connected to the mining scheme beneath Railway Wood and eventually became one of the most complex underground shelter systems in the Ypres Salient. Its mined galleries were named after London streets for easy orientation. Further projects involved 177th Tunnelling Company constructing new dugouts beneath the Menin Road in the centre of Hooge, located in between 175th TC's July 1915 mine crater and the stables of the destroyed Château de Hooge. Parts of these dugouts now lie beneath the Hooge Crater CWGC Cemetery opposite the "Hooge Crater Museum". 177th Tunnelling Company also built the Birr Cross Roads dugout and dressing station beneath the Menin Road further west of Hooge, and the Canal Dugouts along the Ieperlee.

=== Somme ===
March 1918 saw the Company working alongside 173rd Tunnelling Company on construction of the Fifth Army's Green Line near Templeux on the Somme, when the German spring offensive (21 March – 18 July 1918) began. After this the company was engaged in Somme bridge demolition, and other defensive activities.

== Commemoration ==
=== Memorial at Railway Wood ===
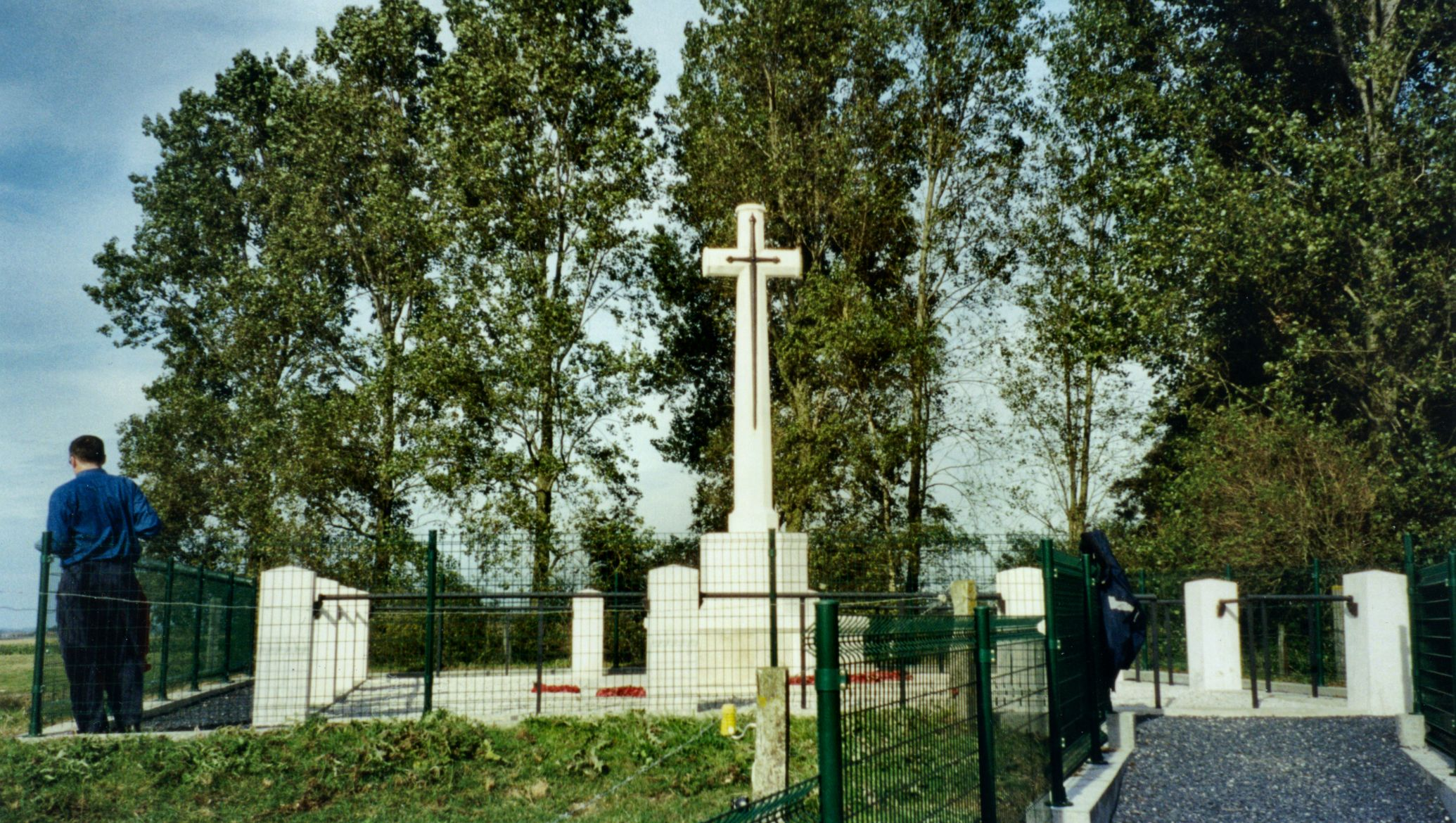
RE Grave, Railway Wood, a memorial to men of the 177th Tunnelling Company

A memorial dedicated to 177th Tunnelling Company and its activities is RE Grave, Railway Wood, maintained by the Commonwealth War Graves Commission (CWGC). It is located in the former Ypres Salient, on the Bellewaerde Ridge near Zillebeke, about 4 kilometres east of Ypres. The memorial marks the site where twelve soldiers (eight Royal Engineers of the 177th Tunnelling Company and four attached infantrymen) were killed between November 1915 and August 1917 whilst tunnelling under the hill near Hooge during the defence of Ypres. The men were trapped underground and their bodies not recovered, and after the war, the memorial was erected on the hill.

=== Lieutenant Boothby's letters ===
The officer mentioned on the Cross of Sacrifice at RE Grave, Railway Wood was Second Lieutenant Charles Geoffrey Boothby (13 December 1894 – 28 April 1916), service number 147252, from near Birmingham. He first attended Clayesmore School, then Christ College, Brecon, between 1909 and 1913. In the autumn of 1913, he entered Birmingham University, and spent a year studying dentistry. He was just short of his 20th birthday when he applied for a commission in December 1914. A year later he was seconded from 8th Battalion, South Staffordshire Regiment to the Royal Engineers. Also in 1915, when he was twenty-one, Boothby had just met eighteen-year-old Edith Ainscow. They exchanged love letters over a period of 18 months until Boothby was reported missing in action in spring 1916, having been blown up by a German mine at Railway Wood on the Bellewaerde Ridge near Ypres. The letter exchange between Boothby and Ainscow survived the war and was eventually published by Edith's son, University of Oxford professor Arthur Stockwin, in 2005.

== See also ==
- Mine warfare

== Bibliography ==
- Iain McHenry, Subterranean Sappers: A History of 177 Tunnelling Company RE from 1915 to 1919, Uniform Press 2015 (ISBN 978-1910500101)
- Holt, Tonie; Holt, Valmai (2014) [1997]. Major & Mrs Holt's Battlefield Guide to the Ypres Salient & Passchendaele. Barnsley: Pen & Sword Books. ISBN 978-0-85052-551-9.
