= Liverpool Scottish Memorial, Railway Wood =

World War I memorial in Belgium

Liverpool Scottish Memorial
- United Kingdom
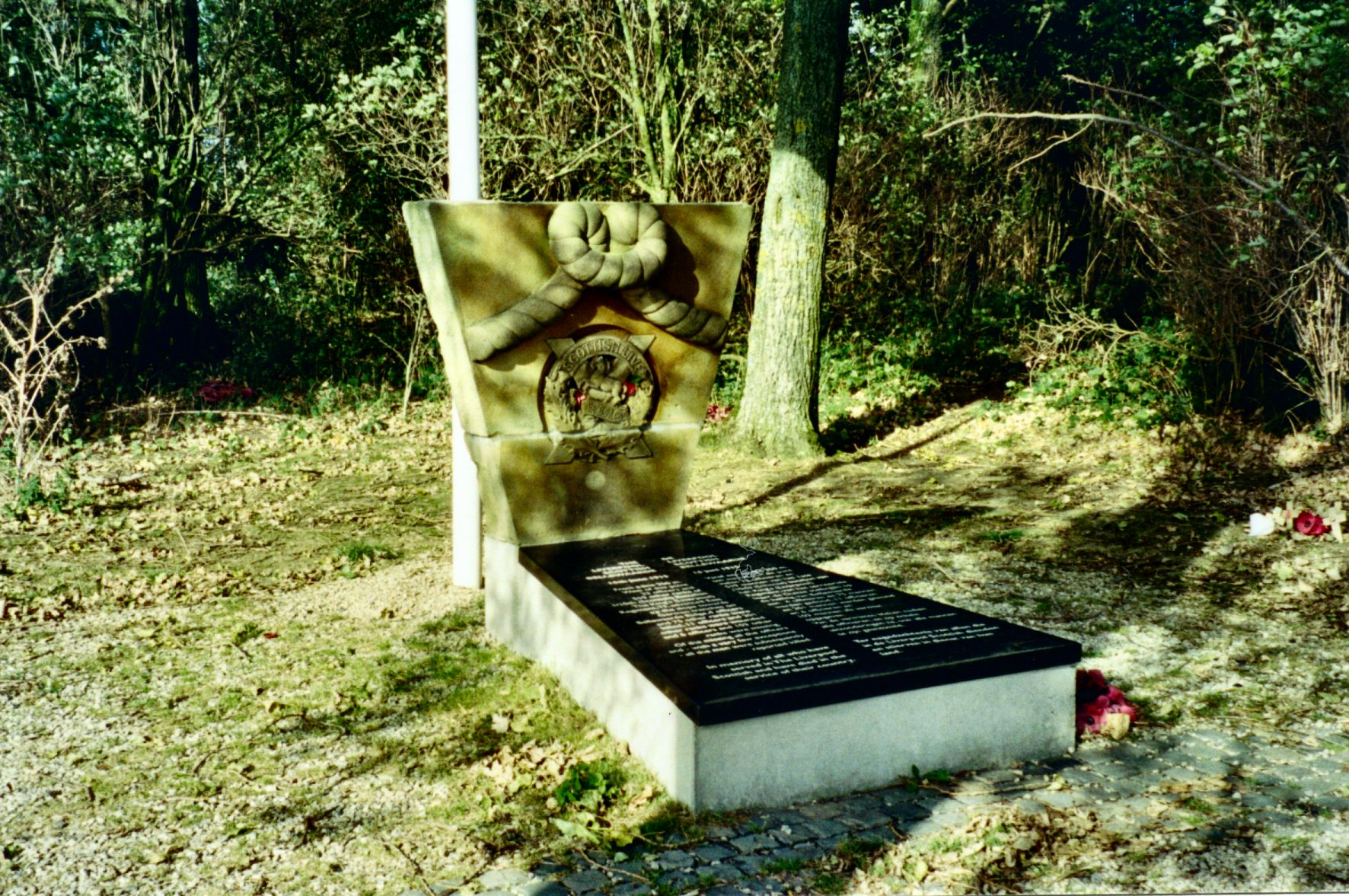
- For those who have served in The Liverpool Scottish
- Unveiled: 29 July 2000
- Location: 50°51′6.84″N 2°56′14.24″E near Zillebeke, West Flanders, Belgium
- Designed by: Unknown
- In memory of all who have served in the Liverpool Scottish and have died in the service of their country

The Liverpool Scottish Memorial is a World War I memorial erected in Belgium in 2000. It is located in Railway Wood on the Bellewaerde Ridge near Zillebeke, about 4 kilometres east of Ypres, and a little north of Hooge. The area was the site of intensive fighting in the First World War. Near the memorial is the site of RE Grave, Railway Wood.

== Unit history ==
The Liverpool Scottish unit of the British Army fought in the second wave of the "Battle of Hooge", officially known as the "First Attack at Bellewaarde", in June 1915 during World War I. This action, in defence of the Ypres Salient, was not altogether successful and resulted in the depletion of the unit. Many men from the battle are buried at Tyne Cot Cemetery.

== Stone history ==
The memorial is made up of three parts - a carved stone, the inscription tablet in black marble and the flagstones around the memorial.

The carved stone, showing the badge of the 10th (Scottish) Battalion, The King's (Liverpool Regiment), was originally the keystone of the Fraser Street barracks of the unit. When the barracks were demolished in 1967 the stone was salvaged and placed into storage. In 1978 it was placed in front of the new Score Lane headquarters on a brick plinth. When these headquarters closed in 1999, the unit decided to move the stone, as part of a new memorial, to the Ypres area.

A black marble inscription, describing the actions at Bellewaarde, was placed at the base of the stone. The flagstones surrounding the memorial were donated by Liverpool City Council and amount to 2 tonnes of paving blocks (cobbles) from the streets of the city.

== Inscription ==
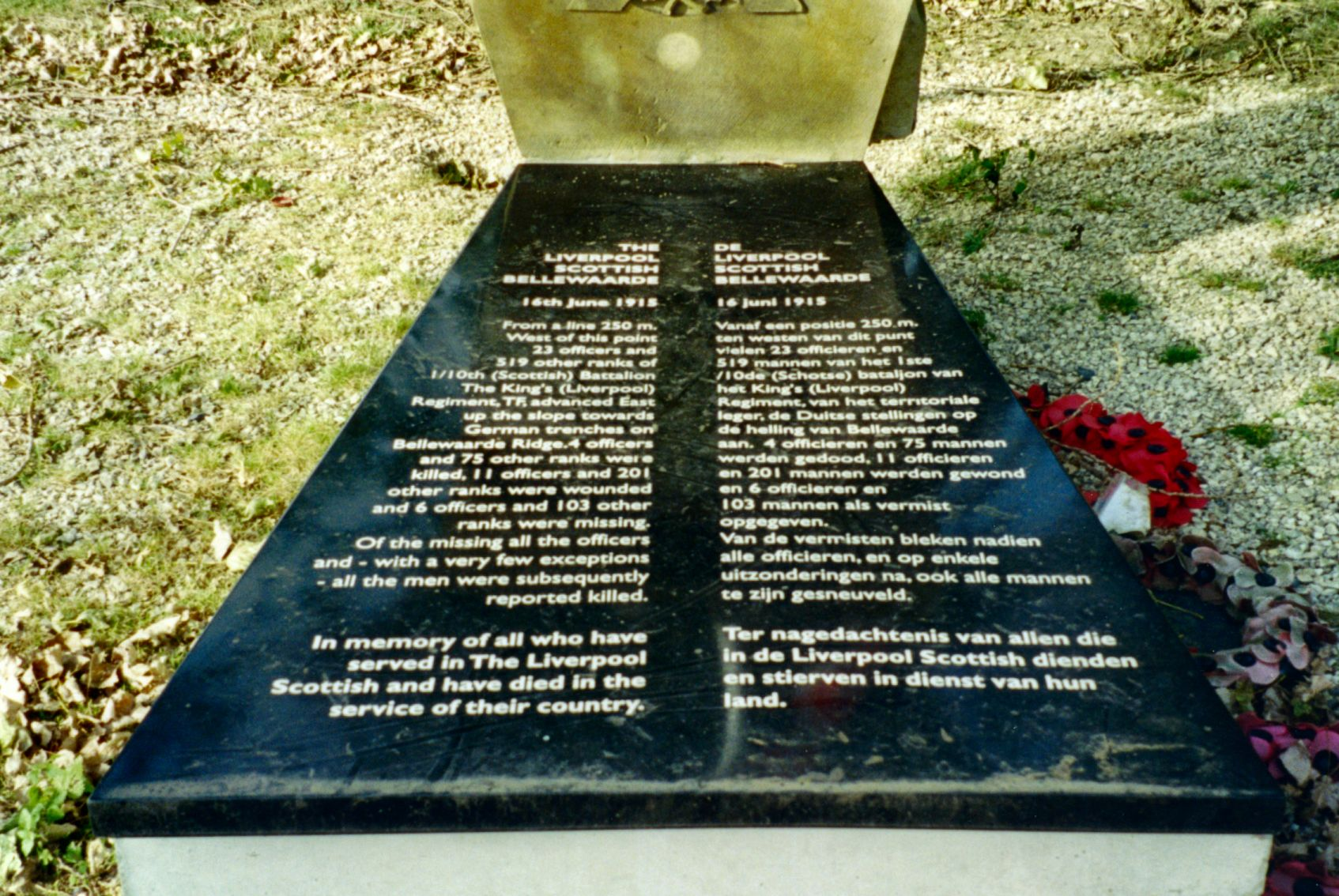
The inscription on the memorial.

The stone is inscribed in English and Dutch, the language of the locality.

In English, it reads:

THE LIVERPOOL SCOTTISH BELLEWAARDE

16 June 1915

From a line 250 m. West of this point 23 officers and 519 other ranks of 1/10 (Scottish) Battalion The King's (Liverpool) Regiment, TF, advanced East up the slope towards German trenches on Bellewaarde Ridge.4 officers and 75 other ranks were killed, 11 officers and 201 other ranks were wounded and 6 officers and 103 other ranks were missing. Of the missing all the officers and - with a very few exceptions - all the men were subsequently reported killed.

In memory of all who have served in The Liverpool Scottish and have died in the service of their country.
