= Hooge, Ypres =

Village in West Flanders, Belgium

Coordinates: 50°50′46.97″N 2°56′36.73″E

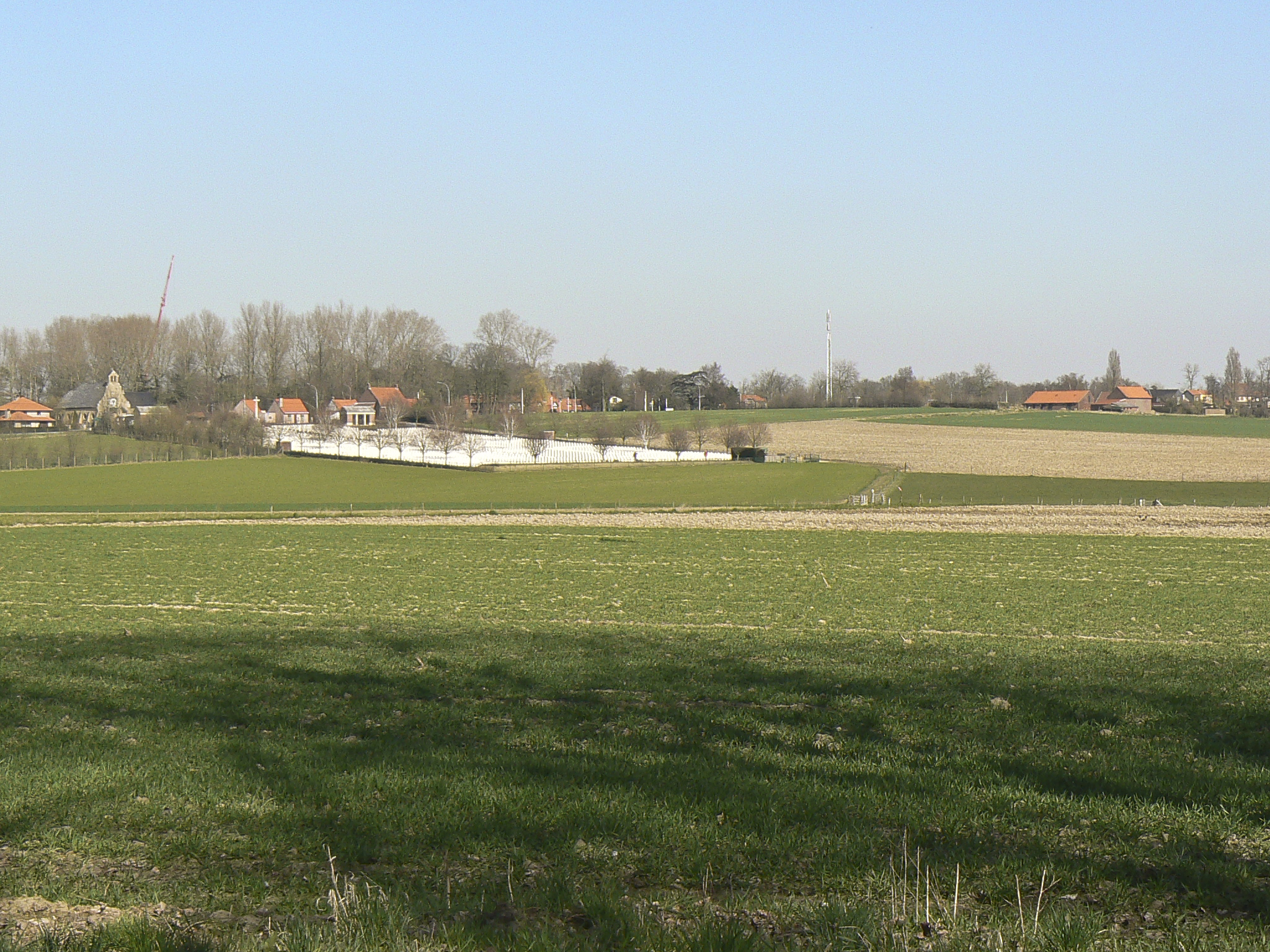
View of Hooge from the south, with the military cemetery clearly visible

Hooge is a small village on the Bellewaerde Ridge, about 4 kilometres east of Ypres in the Flemish province of West Flanders in Belgium. Hooge and the nearby locations of Bellewaerde and Zillebeke were merged into Ypres in 1976. The economy of Hooge is dominated by tourism and agriculture. Tourists are attracted by the World War I battlefields as well as Bellewaerde, the oldest operating theme park in Belgium.

== History ==
=== World War I ===
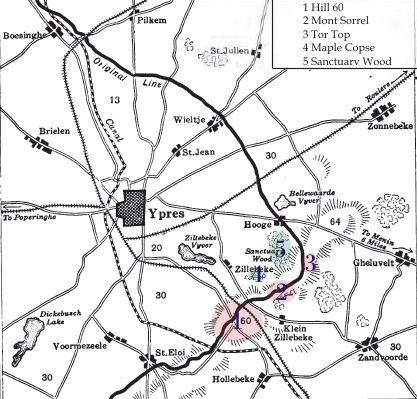
Map showing the location of Hooge directly east of Ypres, as well as the frontline of the Ypres Salient as it was in June 1916.

In World War I, the village belonged to one of the easternmost sectors of the Ypres Salient, which made it the site of intense and sustained fighting between German and Allied forces. From 1914 the front line of the Salient ran through the Hooge area and there was almost constant fighting in the area over the next three years, during which the village and the Château de Hooge (see below) were totally destroyed. Even during times of relative quiet on this part of the Western Front, the average casualty rate for the British and Commonwealth forces was around 300 per day.

During the First Battle of Ypres (19 October – 22 November 1914), when the Allies captured the town of Ypres from the Germans, the Château de Hooge was used by the 1st and 2nd Divisions for their joint headquarters. By the end of the battle in November 1914 the Germans had been driven back, but the front line of the Salient now ran around Hooge.

During the Second Battle of Ypres (22 April – 25 May 1915), Hooge was again the site of intense fighting, including the Battle of Bellewaarde which was fought in the area from 24 to 25 May 1915. By the end of July, the Germans again took control of the area. On 30 July 1915, Hooge was the site of the first use of flamethrowers ("liquid fire" as it was referred to at the time), employed by the Germans against British positions. Hooge was retaken by the British on 9 August 1915, reclaimed by the Germans on 16 June 1916 (for strategic developments in this area during June 1916, see Battle of Mont Sorrel) and retaken by the British on 31 July 1917. The Germans retook Hooge in April 1918 as part of the Spring Offensive but were driven back from the area by the British on 28 September 1918.

== Landmarks ==
=== Château and Bellewaerde ===
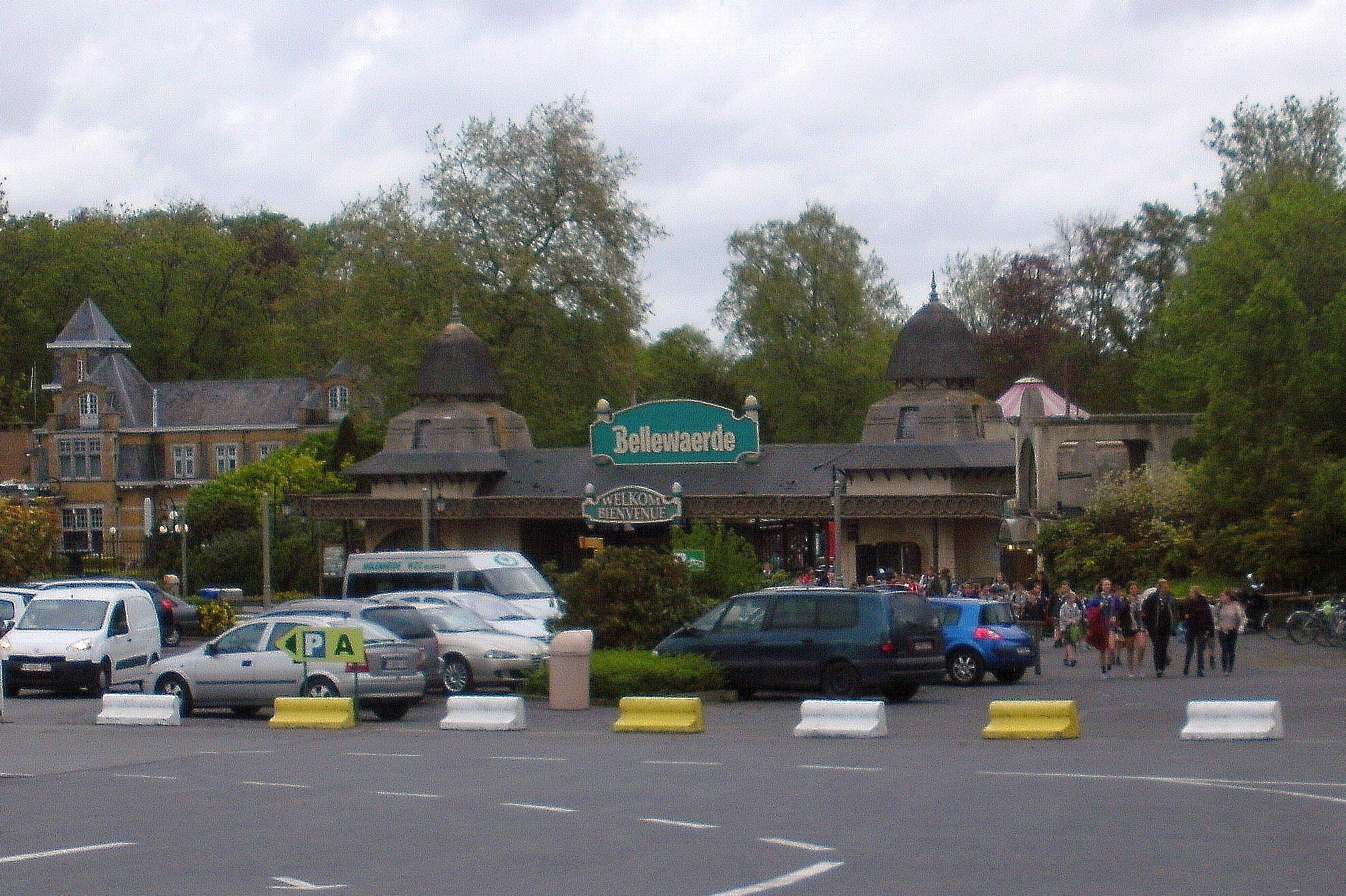
Entrance to Bellewaerde amusement park

Before the war, the village of Hooge was the site of the Château de Hooge, owned by baron Gaston de Vinck, mayor of Zillebeke. By July 1915 artillery had reduced the château to rubble and it was never rebuilt. After the war, much of the site was redeveloped as a theme park and is now occupied by the Bellewaerde, the oldest operating theme park in Belgium. Established in 1954 as a zoo and safari, the park expanded in the early 1980s and is now the most frequently visited amusement park in Flanders. On the site of the château's original stables, there is now a hotel and restaurant.

=== World War I battlefield ===
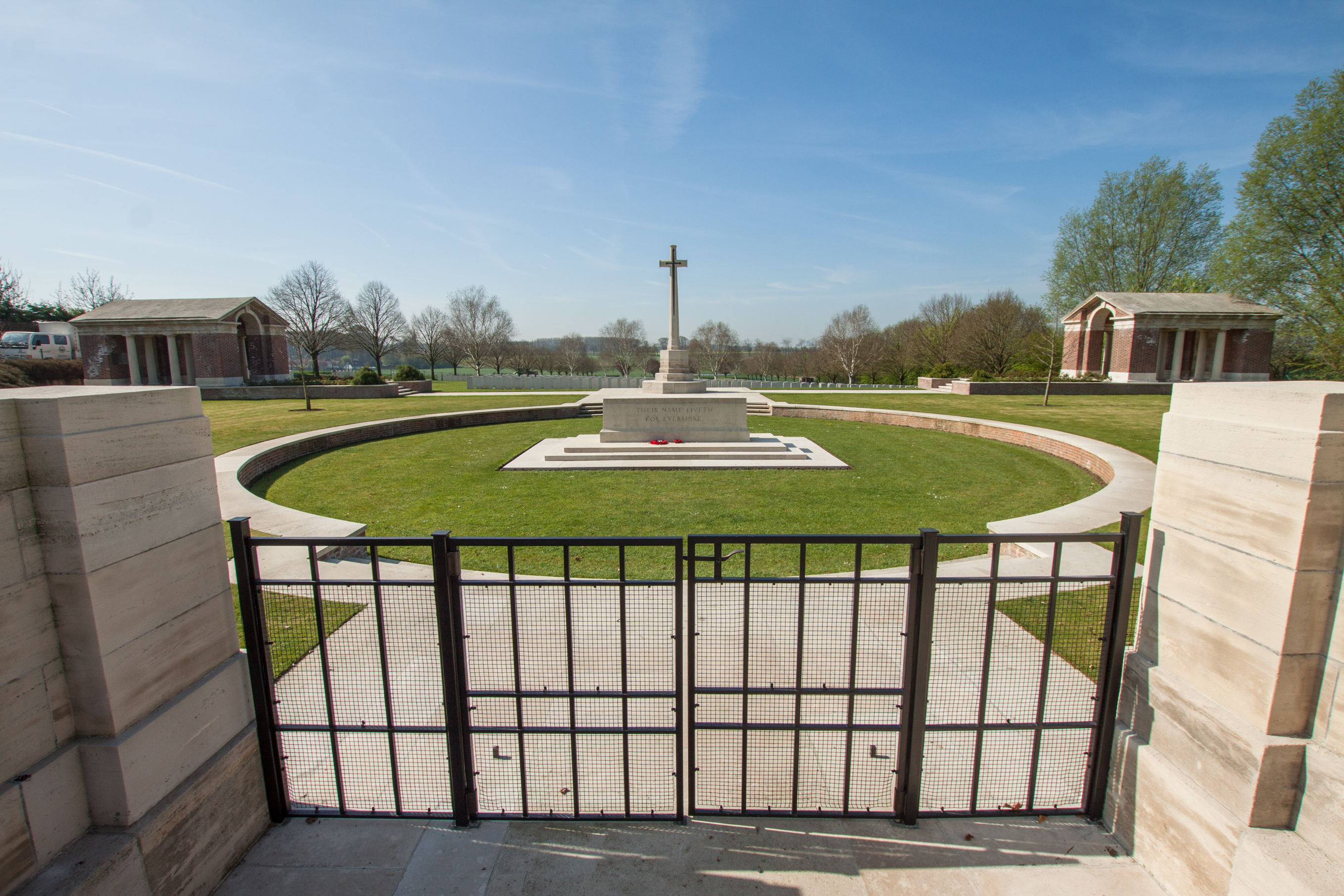
Entrance to Hooge Crater Cemetery with Cross of Sacrifice and the stone-faced circle designed by Sir Edwin Lutyens in memory of the many craters nearby

During World War I, the entire village was completely destroyed. Both sides exploded mines beneath the front line trenches there, the evidence of which are still visible today. Although the largest mine crater (created by a mine detonated at Hooge by the 175th Tunnelling Company of the Royal Engineers on 19 July 1915) has since been filled in, several other large mine craters that were created over the course of the fighting can still be seen. The most visible evidence remaining today is a large pond near the hotel and restaurant at the Bellewaerde theme park. The site is the result of Baron de Wynck, who landscaped three mine craters (blown by German units in June 1916 as part of their offensive against Canadian troops) into the existing pond near the hotel .

There are many memorials and war cemeteries in and around Hooge. These include the Hooge Crater Cemetery, opposite which is now a museum, founded in 1994. A short distance away is the RE Grave, Railway Wood, which marks the spot where soldiers of the 177th Tunnelling Company were killed between November 1915 and August 1917 whilst tunnelling under the hill near Hooge during the defence of Ypres. One of the twelve men commemorated here is Second Lieutenant Charles Geoffrey Boothby (1894–1916), whose wartime letters to his girlfriend were published in 2005.
