= Battle of Ypres =

Series of engagements during the First World War

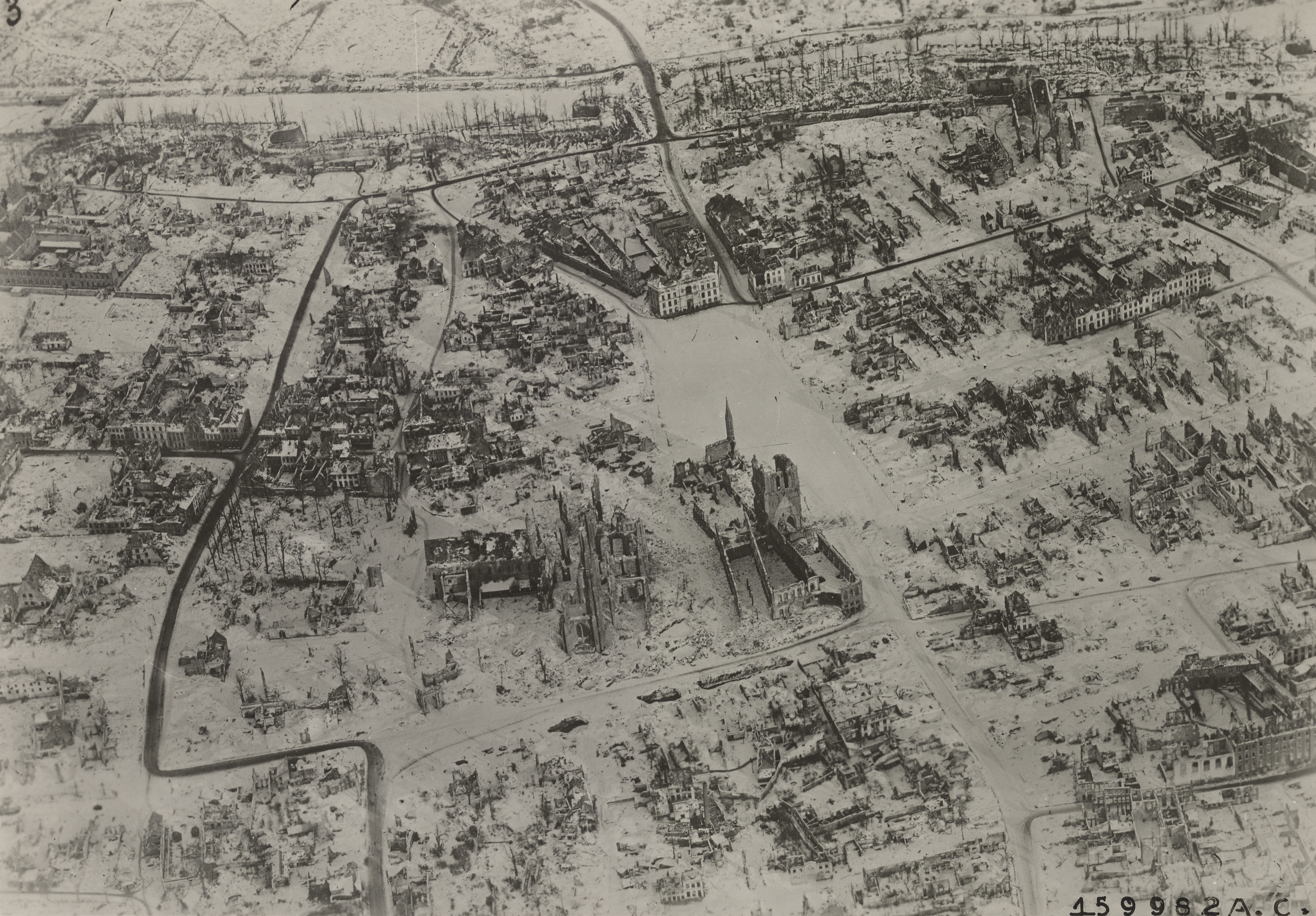
World War I destruction in Ypres, Winter 1917

The Battle of Ypres was a series of engagements during the First World War, near the Belgian city of Ypres, between the German and the Allied armies (Belgian and British colonial forces) and was the last major Belgium city/stronghold held by the Allies before the Spring Offensive.

A study of the battle notes that, ”even on 'quiet days' [at Ypres] casualties [sometimes] ran into the thousands—[as fighting continued] every day, for four long and grisly years… Although for purposes of continuity historians have categorized events at Ypres into three or four major [or five] battles, in fact the fighting there was continuous".

During the five peaks in the engagement at Ypres, casualties may have surpassed one million.

- First Battle of Ypres (19 October – 22 November 1914). During the Race to the Sea, more than 220,000 casualties.
- Second Battle of Ypres (22 April – 25 May 1915). First mass use of poison gas by the German army. Around 100,000 casualties.
- Third Battle of Ypres (31 July – 10 November 1917) also known as the Battle of Passchendaele. Between 400,000 and 900,000 casualties.
- Fourth Battle of Ypres (7 – 29 April 1918) also known as the Battle of the Lys. Around 200,000 casualties.
- Fifth Battle of Ypres (28 September – 2 October 1918) an informal name given to a series of battles in northern France and southern Belgium, also known as Advance of Flanders and Battle of the Peak of Flanders. Around 10,000 Allied casualties; German casualties unknown.
