= RE Grave, Railway Wood =

Commonwealth war graveyard near Ypres, France

- Commonwealth War Graves Commission
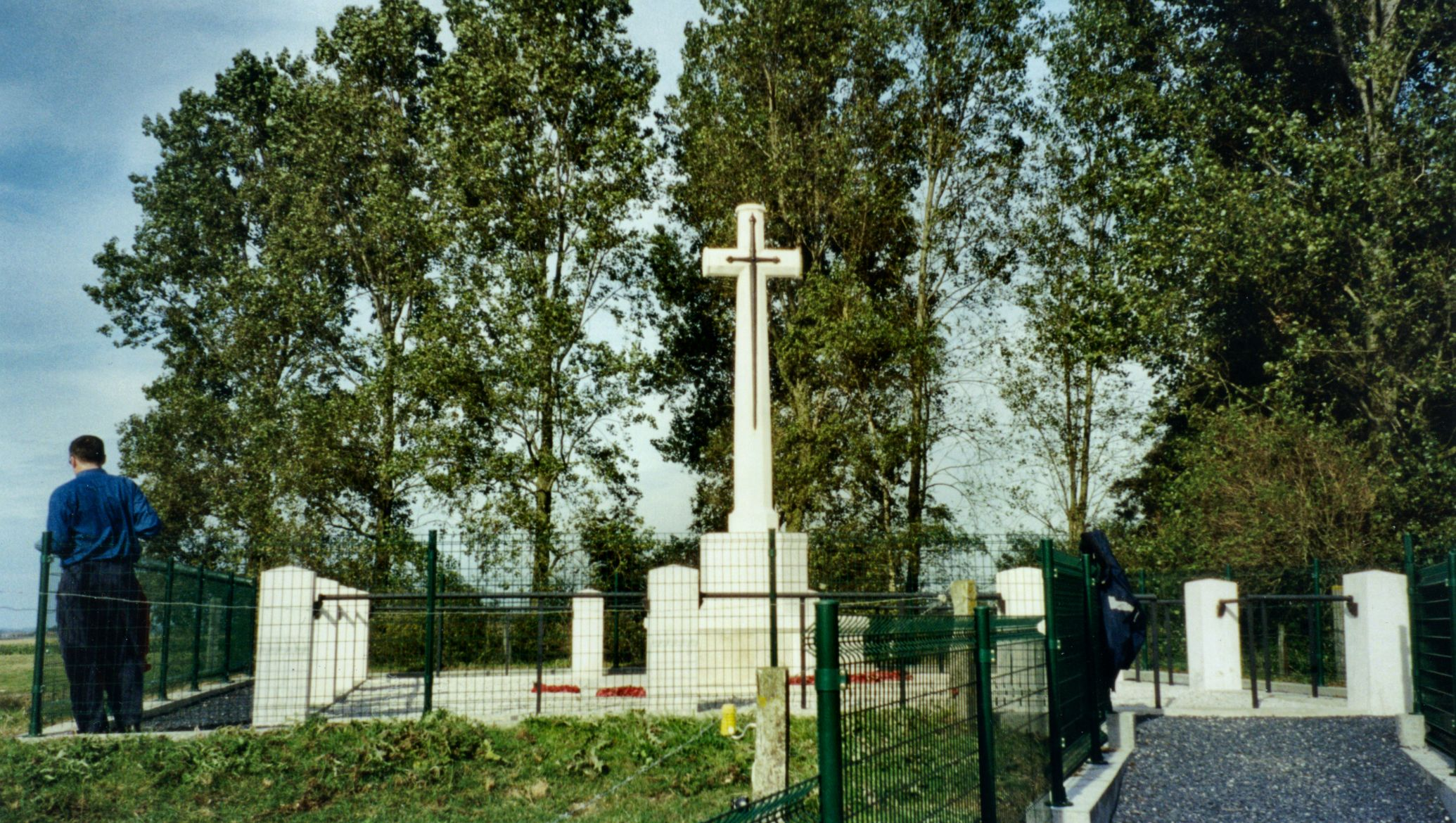
- Used for those deceased November 1915 – August 1917
- Established: 1915
- Location: 50°51′08″N 2°56′13″E near Ypres, West Flanders, Belgium
- Designed by: A J H Holden
- Total burials: 12
- Unknowns: 0

Burials by nation
- Allied Powers: United Kingdom: 12

Burials by war
- World War I: 12

RE Grave, Railway Wood is a Commonwealth War Graves Commission (CWGC) memorial and war grave located in the Ypres Salient on the Western Front. It is located on the Bellewaerde Ridge near Zillebeke, about 4 kilometres east of Ypres, and a little north of Hooge. The area of the Cambridge Road sector, halfway in between Wieltje and Hooge, was the site of intensive underground fighting in the First World War. The Liverpool Scottish Memorial, Railway Wood is located nearby.

== History ==
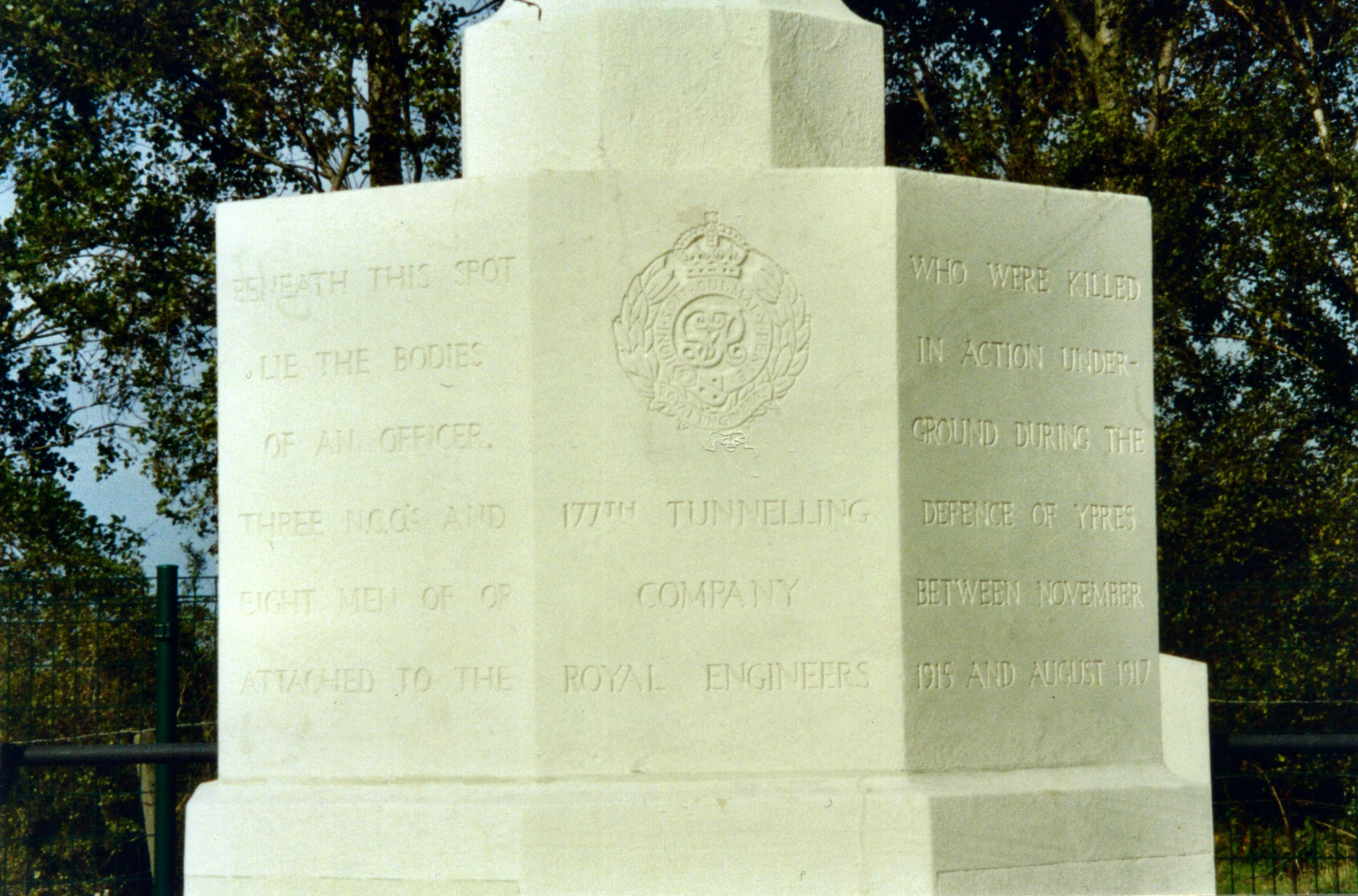
The inscription on the base of the Cross of Sacrifice.

The Royal Engineers grave at Railway Wood marks the site where twelve soldiers (eight Royal Engineers of the 177th Tunnelling Company and four attached infantrymen) were killed between November 1915 and August 1917 whilst tunnelling under the hill near Hooge during the defence of Ypres. The men were trapped underground and their bodies not recovered, and after the war, the memorial was erected on the hill.

The site is unusual for being both a cemetery and a memorial. Because the bodies remain underground, the cemetery has no individual gravestones, and the names of the twelve men who died are inscribed on the Cross of Sacrifice instead. The inscription across three sides of the Cross of Sacrifice reads: Beneath this spot lie the bodies of an officer, three NCOs and eight men of or attached to the / 177th Tunnelling Company Royal Engineers / who were killed in action underground during the defence of Ypres between November 1915 and August 1917.

The grounds were assigned to the United Kingdom in perpetuity by King Albert I of Belgium in recognition of the sacrifices made by the British Empire in the defence and liberation of Belgium during the war and are administrated as a war cemetery by the Commonwealth War Graves Commission.

== Tunneling ==
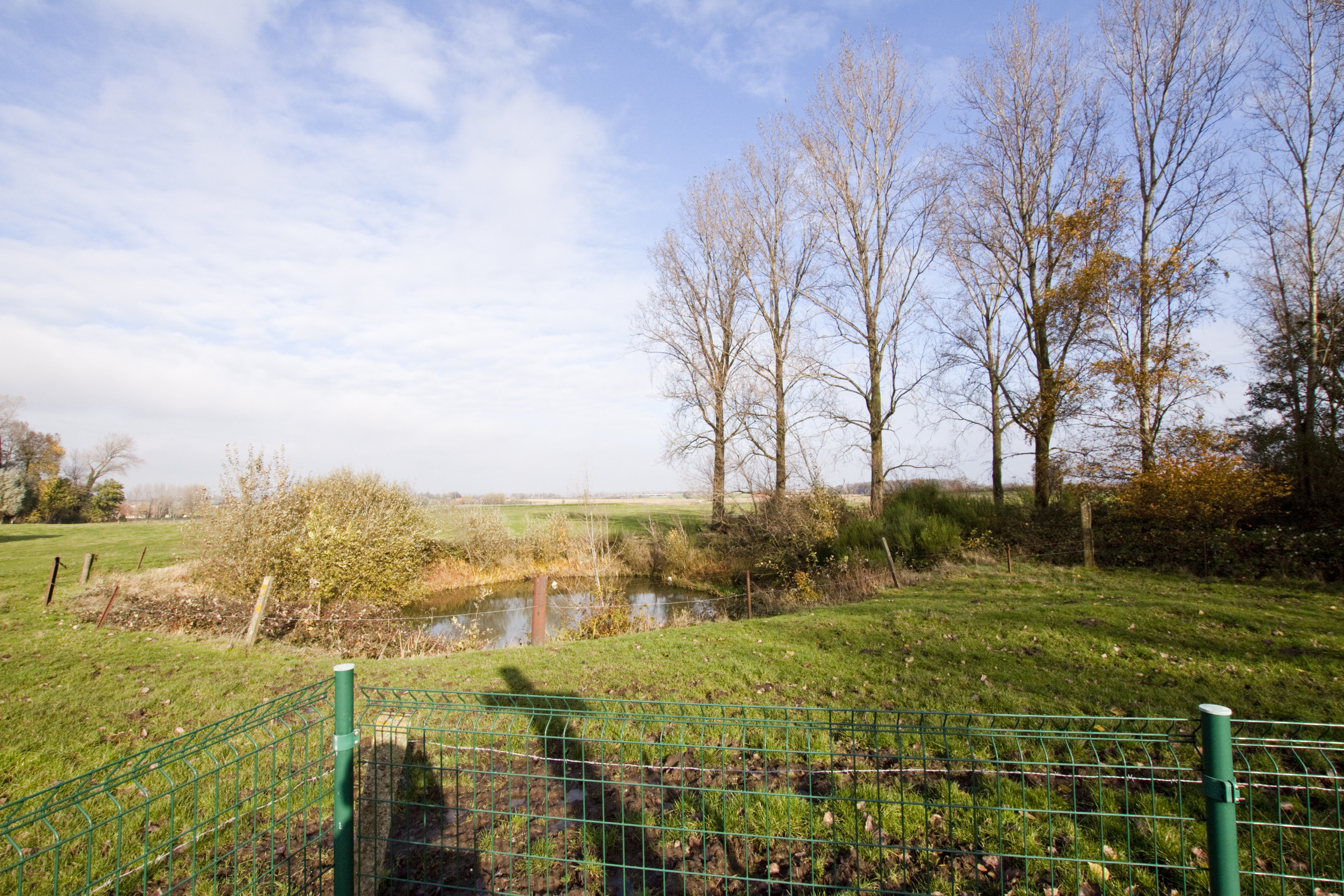
Mine crater at Railway Wood, located just behind the grave site

When 177th Tunnelling Company arrived at Hooge in November 1915, underground warfare in the area was at its height. One of the busiest areas for the miners on both sides was Railway Wood, an area at Hooge where the old Ypres-Roeselare railway crossed the Ypres-Menen road. Aerial photographs clearly show the proliferation of mine warfare in the Railway Wood sector during the unit's presence there, with craters lying almost exclusively in no man's land between the British and German trenches. With both sides trying to undermine their enemy, much of the unit's activity at Railway Wood consisted of creating and maintaining a shallow fighting system with camouflets, a deeper defensive system as well as offensive galleries from an underground shaft. The 177th Tunnelling Company continued mining in the Hooge sector until August 1917. Fighting in the area continued until 1918, with the craters (being strategically important in relatively flat countryside) frequently changing sides.

== Lieutenant Boothby's letters ==
The officer mentioned in the inscription on the Cross of Sacrifice was Second Lieutenant Charles Geoffrey Boothby (13 December 1894 – 28 April 1916), service number 147252, from near Birmingham. He first attended Clayesmore School, then Christ College, Brecon, between 1909 and 1913. In the autumn of 1913, he entered Birmingham University, and spent a year studying dentistry. He was just short of his 20th birthday when he applied for a commission in December 1914. A year later he was seconded from 8th Battalion, South Staffordshire Regiment to the Royal Engineers. Also in 1915, when he was twenty-one, Boothby had just met eighteen-year-old Edith Ainscow. They exchanged love letters over a period of 18 months until Boothby was reported missing in action in spring 1916, having been blown up by a German mine at Railway Wood on the Bellewaerde Ridge near Ypres. The letter exchange between Boothby and Ainscow survived the war and was eventually published by Edith's son, University of Oxford professor Arthur Stockwin, in 2005.

== Bibliography ==
- Barton, Peter; Doyle, Peter; Vandewalle, Johan (2003). Beneath Flanders Fields – The Tunnellers' War 1914–1918. Spellmount. ISBN 978-1862272378.
- Stockwin, Arthur, ed. (2005). Thirty-odd Feet Below Belgium: An Affair of Letters in the Great War 1915–1916. Parapress. ISBN 978-1-89859-480-2.
