= 251st Tunnelling Company =

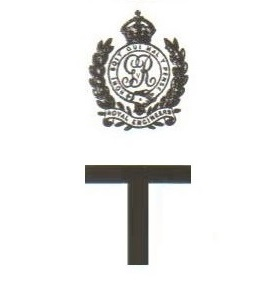
- Active: World War I
- Country: United Kingdom
- Branch: British Army
- Type: Royal Engineer tunnelling company
- Role: military engineering, tunnel warfare
- Nickname: "The Moles"
- Engagements: World War I

The 251st Tunnelling Company was one of the tunnelling companies of the Royal Engineers created by the British Army during World War I. The tunnelling units were occupied in offensive and defensive mining involving the placing and maintaining of mines under enemy lines, as well as other underground work such as the construction of deep dugouts for troop accommodation, the digging of subways, saps (a narrow trench dug to approach enemy trenches), cable trenches and underground chambers for signals and medical services. On Friday, 10 August 1917, 251st Tunnelling Company fired the last British mine of World War I.

== Background ==
By January 1915 it had become evident to the BEF at the Western Front that the Germans were mining to a planned system. As the British had failed to develop suitable counter-tactics or underground listening devices before the war, field marshals French and Kitchener agreed to investigate the suitability of forming British mining units. Following consultations between the Engineer-in-Chief of the BEF, Brigadier George Fowke, and the mining specialist John Norton-Griffiths, the War Office formally approved the tunnelling company scheme on 19 February 1915.

Norton-Griffiths ensured that tunnelling companies numbers 170 to 177 were ready for deployment in mid-February 1915. In the spring of that year, there was constant underground fighting in the Ypres Salient at Hooge, Hill 60, Railway Wood, Sanctuary Wood, St Eloi and The Bluff which required the deployment of new drafts of tunnellers for several months after the formation of the first eight companies. The lack of suitably experienced men led to some tunnelling companies starting work later than others. The number of units available to the BEF was also restricted by the need to provide effective counter-measures to the German mining activities. To make the tunnels safer and quicker to deploy, the British Army enlisted experienced coal miners, many outside their nominal recruitment policy. The first nine companies, numbers 170 to 178, were each commanded by a regular Royal Engineers officer. These companies each comprised 5 officers and 269 sappers; they were aided by additional infantrymen who were temporarily attached to the tunnellers as required, which almost doubled their numbers. The success of the first tunnelling companies formed under Norton-Griffiths' command led to mining being made a separate branch of the Engineer-in-Chief's office under Major-General S.R. Rice, and the appointment of an 'Inspector of Mines' at the GHQ Saint-Omer office of the Engineer-in-Chief. A second group of tunnelling companies were formed from Welsh miners from the 1st and 3rd Battalions of the Monmouthshire Regiment, who were attached to the 1st Northumberland Field Company of the Royal Engineers, which was a Territorial unit. The formation of twelve new tunnelling companies, between July and October 1915, helped to bring more men into action in other parts of the Western Front.

Most tunnelling companies were formed under Norton-Griffiths' leadership during 1915, and one more was added in 1916. On 10 September 1915, the British government sent an appeal to Canada, South Africa, Australia and New Zealand to raise tunnelling companies in the Dominions of the British Empire. On 17 September, New Zealand became the first Dominion to agree the formation of a tunnelling unit. The New Zealand Tunnelling Company arrived at Plymouth on 3 February 1916 and was deployed to the Western Front in northern France. A Canadian unit was formed from men on the battlefield, plus two other companies trained in Canada and then shipped to France. Three Australian tunnelling companies were formed by March 1916, resulting in 30 tunnelling companies of the Royal Engineers being available by the summer of 1916.

== Unit history ==
The history of this unit was documented in detail by Robert K. Johns in his book Battle Beneath the Trenches: The Cornish Miners of 251 Tunnelling Company RE.

251st Tunnelling Company was formed at Hayle, Cornwall. This Company took over from 170th Tunnelling Company in the Loos area in October 1915, around Cuinchy-Cambrin-Auchy, where it remained for a considerable time. From May 1916 until January 1919 the company served under Reserve (later Fifth) Army.

The company blew the last mine fired by the British in the Great War, near Givenchy, on 10 August 1917. By April 1918, the 251st Tunnelling Company were in the area between the Lys and La Bassee canal, working on defensive schemes. 251st Tunnelling Company took part in the successful defence of Givenchy when the Allied units there were attacked by German forces in that month.

In addition, specialist tin miners were also recruited from the Cornish mines mainly joining the 251st Tunnelling Company. To attract the tin miners, a per diem of six shillings a day was offered to underground miners, which was around double to that was being paid in the mines.

On Friday, 10 August 1917, the Royal Engineers fired the last British deep mine of the war, at Givenchy-en-Gohelle near Arras. Around 7:05 a.m., the 251st Tunnelling Company on the 5th Infantry Brigade front of the 2nd Division, exploded a mine at the northern end of the brigade sector, near Surrey Crater, which became known as Warlingham Crater.

== See also ==
- Mine warfare
