= Tunnelling companies of the Royal Engineers =

British Army units in World War I

Royal engineer Tunnelling Companies
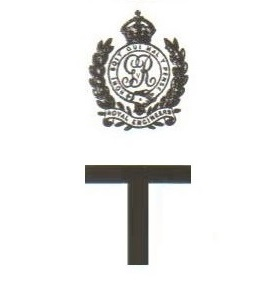
- Active: First World War
- Country: United Kingdom
- Branch: British Army
- Type: Field corps
- Garrison/HQ: Saint-Omer/Aldershot
- Nickname: "The Moles"
- Engagements: Battle of Hill 60; Battle of Aubers Ridge; Battle of Mont Sorrel; Battle of the Somme; Battle of Messines; Battle of Vimy Ridge; Battle of Arras (1917); Second Battle of Passchendaele

Commanders
- Notable commanders: Major John Norton-Griffiths MP

Royal Engineer tunnelling companies were specialist units of the Corps of Royal Engineers within the British Army formed to dig attacking tunnels under enemy lines during the First World War.

The stalemate situation in the early part of the war led to the deployment of tunnel warfare. After the first German Empire attacks on 21 December 1914, through shallow tunnels underneath no man's land and exploding ten mines under the trenches of the Indian Sirhind Brigade, the British began forming suitable units. In February 1915, eight Tunnelling Companies were created and operational in Flanders from March 1915. By mid-1916, the British Army had around 25,000 trained tunnellers, mostly volunteers taken from coal mining communities. Almost twice that number of "attached infantry" worked permanently alongside the trained miners acting as 'beasts of burden'.

From the spring of 1917 the whole war became more mobile, with grand offensives at Arras, Messines and Passchendaele. There was no longer a place for a tactic that depended upon total stasis for its employment. The tactics and counter-tactics required deeper and deeper tunnelling, hence more time and more stable front lines were also required, so offensive and defensive military mining largely ceased. Underground work continued, with the tunnellers concentrating on deep dugouts for troop accommodation, a tactic used particularly in the Battle of Arras.

== Background ==
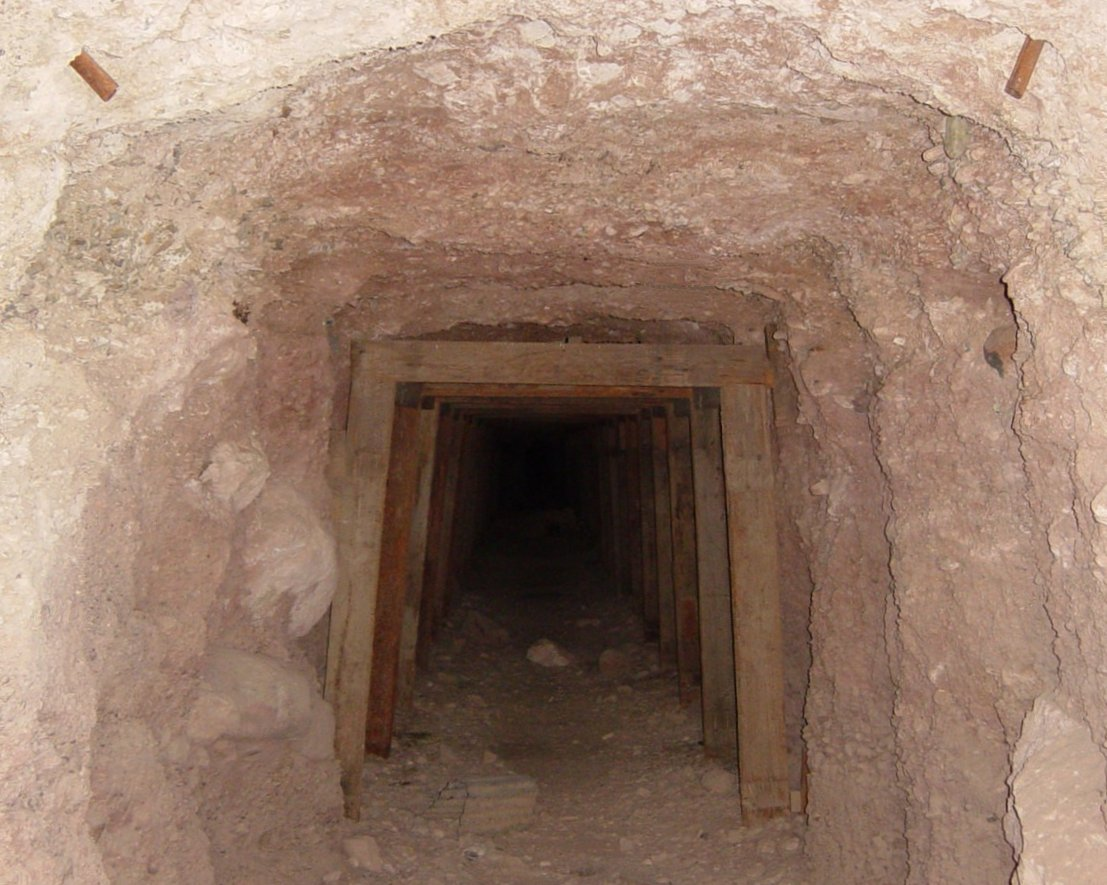
Example of a mine gallery with timber roof support

In siege warfare, tunnelling is a long-held tactic for breaching and breaking enemy defences. The Greek historian Polybius, in his Histories, described accounts of mining during Philip V of Macedon's siege of the town of Prinassos; there is also a graphic account of mining and counter-mining at the Roman siege of Ambracia. Mining was a method used in siege warfare in ancient China from at least the Warring States (481–221 BC) period forward.

In 1215 during the First Barons' War, John, King of England laid siege to Rochester Castle. Eventually, he ordered his troops to dig a tunnel under the south tower, which they held up with pit props. After the tunnellers lit the props, the tower fell down, ending the siege even though the castle's main walls remained standing.

In 1346, Edward III of England requested that miners from the Forest of Dean, Gloucestershire accompany his expedition to France, during the first part of the Hundred Years' War between England and France.

The Corps of Royal Engineers were formed in 1717. In 1770, the Company of Soldier Artificers formed a specialist tunnelling troop in Gibraltar to dig defensive positions into the Rock.

During the Siege of Lucknow in 1857, Royal Engineers were asked to undertake counter-mining.

The use of mines filled with explosives as an offensive weapon for trench warfare was pioneered during the American Civil War, where a large mine was exploded by Union forces during the Battle of the Crater.

== First World War formation ==
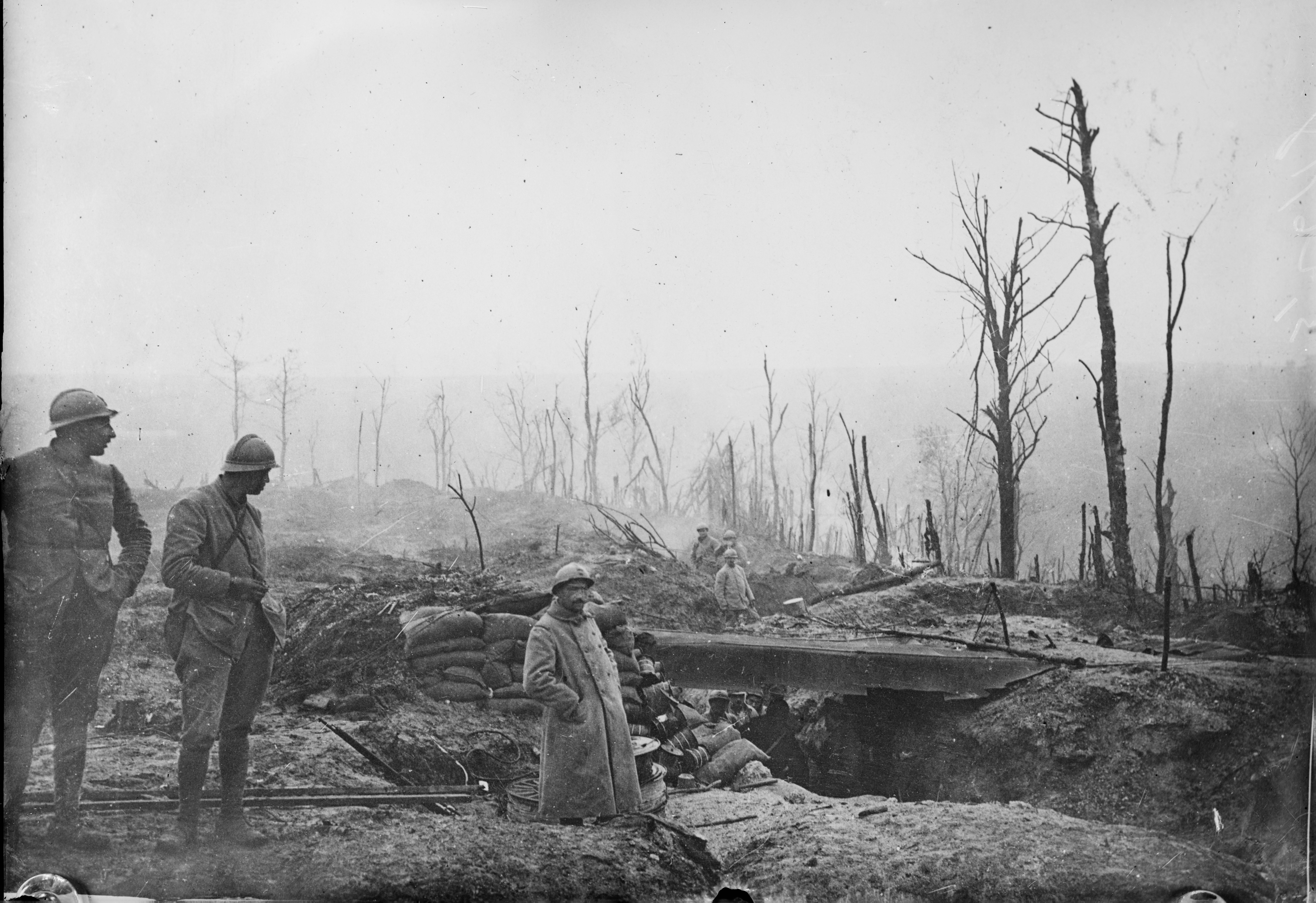
French Army Trench in northeastern France

By the end of May 1915, continuous opposed trenches with no vulnerable flanks, stretched from the North Sea coast to neutral Switzerland. With both sides equally well dug-in and deploying comparable troop numbers and armaments, neither was to prove strong enough to force a decisive breakthrough. The resultant static warfare meant that tunnelling saw a brief resurgence as a military tactic. As in siege warfare, mining was possible due to the nature of the fighting. Secondly, the ground on the Western Front was a prime candidate for underground warfare. Although the British were equipped with Royal Engineers who were trained in carrying out sapping, mining and tunnelling operations, there was no core team of specialist skills.

=== Request and proposal ===
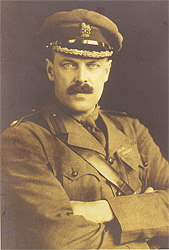
Major Sir John Norton-Griffiths MP, founder of the Royal Engineers tunnelling companies

Even before it became apparent that the Germans were mining to a planned system, the commanding officer of the IV Corps, Lieutenant-General Henry Rawlinson, requested the establishment on 3 December 1914, of a special battalion to assist with mining duties.

Towards the end of 1914, the civil engineering company of Member of Parliament and British Army Major, John Norton-Griffiths, was working on sewerage renewal contracts in Liverpool and Manchester. The relatively small-bore tunnels were being driven by a manual technique known as clay-kicking. Only useful in firm clay soils, the man doing the digging sat with his back supported by a wooden frame, with his feet pointing towards the cutting face. With a spade-like tool he dug out the clay, passing the spoil over-head to one of his mates for disposal at the rear. In early December 1914, Norton-Griffiths wrote to the War Office suggesting that the technique would be useful attack, spying or for intercepting German tunnels coming in the opposite direction. He concluded by asking to be allowed to take a group of his "moles" to France where if the soil was right, they could quickly undermine enemy positions. His letter was filed.

On 20 December 1914, by digging shallow tunnels under no man's land, German sappers placed eight 50 kg (110 lb) mines beneath the positions of the Indian Sirhind Brigade in Givenchy-lès-la-Bassée. Following their simultaneous detonation, an infantry attack resulted in the loss of the entire company of 800 men.

=== Kitchener responds ===
Following further attacks, it was evident by January 1915 that the Germans were mining to a planned system. As the British had failed to develop suitable counter-tactics or listening devices, Field Marshal John French, commander of the British Expeditionary Force, wrote to the Secretary of State for War, Herbert Kitchener, describing the seriousness of the German mining situation. Norton-Griffiths received a telegram on 12 February 1915, instructing him to report to the War Office. On his arrival, he was shown into Kitchener's private offices, There, Kitchener showed him French's letter. Kitchener then asked Norton-Griffiths for his advice. Using a coal shovel from the room's fire grate, Norton-Griffiths sat on the floor and gave a demonstration of "clay-kicking."

Impressed but sceptical, Kitchener asked Norton-Griffiths to travel that day to France to communicate his method to the commanders there, and confirm the suitability of the Flanders soil. If positive, he would then raise a suitable battalion of "moles", as Norton-Griffiths had named his new teams, the same name as their civil engineering counterparts. Arriving with two of his employees at the GHQ Saint-Omer office of the Engineer-in-Chief (E-in-C), Brigadier George Henry Fowke, on 13 February, Norton-Griffiths gave another demonstration of "clay-kicking." A sceptical Fowke instructed his assistant, Colonel Harvey, to take Norton-Griffiths and his employees to Army and Corps headquarters on 14 February, to see what the Corps of Royal Engineers thought of the idea.

In an early public relations exercise, on 14 February, Norton-Griffiths got Colonel Harvey to stop at four headquarters – Army, Corps, Division and Brigade. At each briefing, Norton-Griffiths repeated his demonstration. On arrival at the front line, (a mile from where the first German mine had exploded the previous December), they confirmed the excellent conditions of the clay-based soil and returned to St Omer via the four headquarters to communicate their findings. The following day, the team held further meetings in St Omer, concluding with a meeting between Norton-Griffiths, Fowke and Sir John French, the C-in-C, for a personal explanation. Fowke gave his agreement to a trial to which French agreed, and the three set out a structure for what were to be called tunnelling companies, rather than Norton-Griffiths' preference for 'moles': a symbol which many of the tunnelling companies would later adopt as their unit sign.

In a meeting with Lord Kitchener on 17 February, he reported on his visit to France and the agreement of Collins and Fowke to form trial tunnelling companies. Norton-Griffiths pointed out that to deploy the units at the speed which Lord Kitchener had suggested, would require the recruitment of civilians, who could not undergo basic military training to enable their immediate deployment to the front line. Kitchener's staff were highly sceptical of the proposal, but using his carte-blanche skill to cull such skilled men from regular infantry units, Norton-Griffiths won his argument. The same day, 17 February, British sappers at Hill 60 near Ypres blew a small mine which they had taken over from the French, but without great effect. The Germans retaliated with a small mine at Zwarteleen, but were driven out of the British positions. On 21 February, however, they blew a large mine nearby, killing forty-seven men and ten officers of the 16th Lancers. In mid-March the Germans blew another large mine at Zwarteleen, creating a 9.1-metre (30 ft) deep crater and damaging their own lines in the process.

=== First tunnelling companies ===
Norton Griffiths travelled to Manchester on 18 February and closed down one of his tunnelling contracts, making 18 staff redundant. The following day the War Office gave its approval to the Royal Engineers tunnelling company scheme. On the same day, 18 formerly redundant Manchester men turned up in Chatham to be enrolled, clothed and turned into Royal Engineers. One of the most rapid acts of the First World War, men who were working underground as civilians on 17 February, were working underground on the Western Front a mere four days later. The first nine Royal Engineer Tunnelling Companies, numbers 170 to 178, were each commanded by a regular RE officer – they comprised: five officers and 269 sappers, aided by temporarily attached infantrymen as required, (which almost doubled the companies' number). Norton-Griffiths, in the rank of major, acted as a liaison officer between these units and the E-in-C's office in St Omer.

Although able to select almost any soldier he wished, as he had predicted, Norton-Griffiths was quickly forced to recruit civilians. The new recruits in these units, aged anything up to 60, did not readily conform to military discipline and Norton-Griffiths' skills as a politician and as an engineer were called on in recruiting the men he needed and integrating them into the military environment. His judgement of people was remarkably accurate, he very rarely made a mistake in selecting men for a commission. The deployment of the first eight units led to the introduction of the tunnelling method that allowed the British to dig tunnels at a rate of 8 metres (8.7 yd) per day, compared to the Germans' 2 metres (2.2 yd).

=== Hill 60, Ypres Salient ===
The first attack of the newly formed tunnelling companies of the Royal Engineers was carried out by 173rd Tunnelling Company. First deployed in the Ypres Salient with the 28th Division, the tunnelers laid six mines by 10 April 1915. These mines (together with others that were unfinished) were filled with around 10,000 pounds (4,500 kg) of Ammonal explosives, the resulting explosions ripping the heart out of Hill 60 over a period of about 10 seconds. The effect was a mini-earthquake that split the ground under the entire hill, white flames shot 300 feet (91 m) into the sky. Concrete pillboxes and soldiers occupying them came down in all directions 300 yards (270 m) away. The explosion resulted in a 70 feet (21 m) deep crater, with surrounding trenches sandwiched shut so fast that soldiers were crushed, still in their standing positions. The Germans all around were crying with fear. Many retreated in terror, the-then tunnel master, Otto von Füsslein, was castigated, although the position was quickly recaptured a few days later.

The action showed the importance of the necessity for a counter-offensive against German mining on the British lines. Having proven the system, Norton-Griffiths left the company and returned to London in April 1916 and his duties as an MP. He left GHQ with his rough plan of August 1915 for extensive mining on the Messines front, which formed the framework on which mines were used at the Battle of Messines two years later. He was awarded the Distinguished Service Order for his efforts, mentioned in dispatches three times and promoted to lieutenant colonel in 1916.

=== Expansion ===
The success of the Tunnelling Companies led to mining being made a separate branch of the new E-in-C's office, which was under Major-General S.R. Rice and the appointment of an Inspector of Mines at GHQ. The second group of tunnelling companies were formed from Welsh miners from the 1st and 3rd Battalions of the Monmouthshire Regiment, who were attached to the 1st Northumberland Field Company, Royal Engineers, a Territorial unit.

Twelve Tunnelling Companies were ultimately formed in 1915 and one more in 1916. A Canadian troop was formed from men on the battlefield, plus two other companies trained in Canada and then shipped to France. Three Australian and one New Zealand tunnelling companies were formed by March 1916. This resulted in 30 companies by the end of 1916, many made up of ex-miners. The establishment for a tunnelling company was set at 14 officers and 307 other ranks (ORs). Early in 1916, 20 of the companies were to be raised to a higher establishment of 18 officers and 530 ORs, but none ever reached that strength; the other five remained on the original establishment. All of these companies were occupied on other underground work such as the digging of subways, saps (a narrow trench dug to approach enemy trenches), cable trenches, underground chambers for such things as signals and medical services, as well as offensive and defensive mining.

=== Methodology ===
Both sides deployed tunnelling, with the German lead quickly followed by the British follow-up. The result was a labyrinth of tunnels within a cat and mouse-like game of tunnelling, counter-tunnelling and counter tactics. As the tactics and counter tactics deployed against each other became less and less effective, the depth at which the tunnels needed to be dug became deeper and deeper and hence more dangerous. The result was a greater time to dig, resulting in a greater vulnerability to both leakage of information and tunnel collapse, and a higher loss of lives in the most hideous of circumstances: entombment, drowning, gassing or obliteration in cramped and claustrophobic galleries beneath no man's land.

=== Recruitment ===
To make the tunnels safer and quicker to deploy, the British Army enlisted experienced coal miners, many outside their nominal recruitment policy. The desperate need for skilled men saw notices requesting volunteer tunnellers posted in collieries, mineral mines and quarries across South Wales, Scotland and the Northeast of England covering Derbyshire, County Durham, Nottinghamshire and Yorkshire. In addition, specialist tin miners were also recruited from the Cornish mines mainly joining the 251st Company RE. To attract the tin miners, a per diem of six shillings a day was offered to underground miners, which was around double to that was being paid in the mines.

The mining assistants who acted as 'beasts of burden' were often made up of "Bantams" - soldiers of below average height who had been rejected from regular units because they did not meet the height requirements. Upon the declaration of war in August 1914, William Hackett applied and was turned down three times at the age of 41 by the York and Lancaster Regiment. On 25 October 1915, despite having been diagnosed with a heart condition, he was enlisted and sent for two weeks basic training at Chatham, joining 172nd Tunnelling Company.

=== Digging ===
As tunnels were vulnerable to attack, the entrances were a closely guarded secret. With electricity in short supply in the frontline, tunnellers were forced to work by candlelight. Operating in near silence to avoid detection, the tunnels were cold, cramped and often up to a foot deep in freezing water. Tunnel entrances were most often at the bottom of deep shafts. From here, using the clay-kicking technique, the tunnels were aligned and given direction by the simple use of candlelight. They were built on a slight uphill gradient of between 1:100 and 1:50 to keep them as dry as possible. This meant that they were also vulnerable to the accumulation of gas at the digging face.

A clay-kicking team typically consisted of three men: a "Kicker" who worked at the face, a "Bagger" who filled sandbags with the lumps of clay spoil, and a "Trammer" who transported the bags out of the gallery on a small, rubber-tyred trolley on rails. The trolley was also employed to bring timber in on the return journey. If the tunnel was long, the trammer was given extra assistants to speed the exit of spoil and intake of timber. The team was responsible for its own safety, and would insert a 'sett' of wooden supports every 9 inches (0.23 m). As no nails or screws could be used due to noise, the 'setts' (consisting of a sole, two legs and a cap), were sawn with a rebated step, which, once trimmed into the clay, would expand with the absorbed water into a solid structure.

=== Working conditions ===
Working in cold, cramped conditions, miners worked in 6- or 12-hour rotating shifts. Miners were prone to illness, with high rates of trench foot and bad food disease, while fatigue compounded the situation, creating a high mortality rate. The miners also had to cope with difficult circumstances when they entered the mining tunnels. Often the tunnels were dark, small and flooded with water. Tunnellers were billeted quite a long way back from the front line, while a regular Royal Navy-style rum ration was issued to keep out the cold. Natural gases and gases given off as a result of explosions could ignite, poison or asphyxiate. The major problem gas for tunnellers was carbon monoxide, given off by all projectiles from shells to rifle bullets.

With the use of experienced miners, came the use of "miners friends" in the form of mice and later small birds, such as canaries. With a high metabolic rate, they were readily susceptible to gas, and issued to the Tunnelling Companies as an official item. When gas was present, their unconsciousness would alert miners to the need to evacuate. Although many animals died, others would recover on the surface, with at least one company keeping a record of the gassings so that their creatures did not have to endure more than three instances before being pensioned off to an aviary. The role of the miners friends are honoured on the Scottish National War Memorial in Edinburgh. In extensive tunnelling systems, air-tight doors were introduced to control air flows.

=== Mine rescue ===
Such was the reliance on mining during the early stages of the war, that eventually mining-related casualties became so great that the War Office decided something had to be done about mine rescue. The skilled mining volunteers were particularly hard to replace. In one six-week period, one tunnelling company had 16 men killed; 48 sent to hospital; and 86 minor cases treated at the shaft head and returned to company billets. Another company suffered 12 men killed by gas; 28 sent to hospital in one month; 60 minor cases were retained with the unit. The affected mining units put out an urgent call for appropriate rescue equipment. Captain D Dale Logan was appointed advisor to GHQ in September 1915 on all matters connected with the health of the specially enlisted Tunnelling Companies.

In June 1915, Lance Corporal Arthur B. Clifford was made solely responsible for mine safety training. Sent to the front to train 3000 mine-rescue troops in a month, there were only 36 sets of 'PROTO' breathing equipment available in the whole of the United Kingdom. Clifford was based with the Royal Engineers at Strazeele, with a sub-station at Berguette. This became the first Army Mine-Rescue School. Clifford was awarded the Meritorious Service Medal in 1917 for what he had achieved.

From July 1916, under Logan's new organisation, the second Army Mine-Rescue School was established at Armentières. This allowed the British to deploy a system of mines rescue, where no mining shaft was further than 200 metres (220 yd) from a rescue station. Named after the kit they employed, Proto-men were hand-picked experienced miners, selected for coolness under pressure. Two men were on duty at all times, with additional access to 10 electric miners lamps, six canaries, four mobile cages, one saw, one hand axe, three life-lines, two mine stretchers, one trench stretcher, one Primus stove, two tins of café au lait, six hot water bottles and six blankets.

=== Underground fighting ===
As a result of so much mining activity by both sides, detection and breakthrough into each other's tunnelling systems occurred frequently. The result was often the deployment of the emergency camouflet, a pre-prepared charge which was always ready in the British and Allied forces sectors when tunnelling was taking place. Vicious hand-to-hand fighting in the dark with picks, shovels and wood used as weapons might also take place. Although all miners were trained to use rifles, the restrictions of tunnel construction and the conditions of the tunnels where the miners had to operate often meant they could not be used. If the opposing side were unsuccessful in repelling an attack, then enemy tunnels could be used for short periods to observe enemy tunnelling activity and direction.

== Counter-mining ==
=== Listening ===
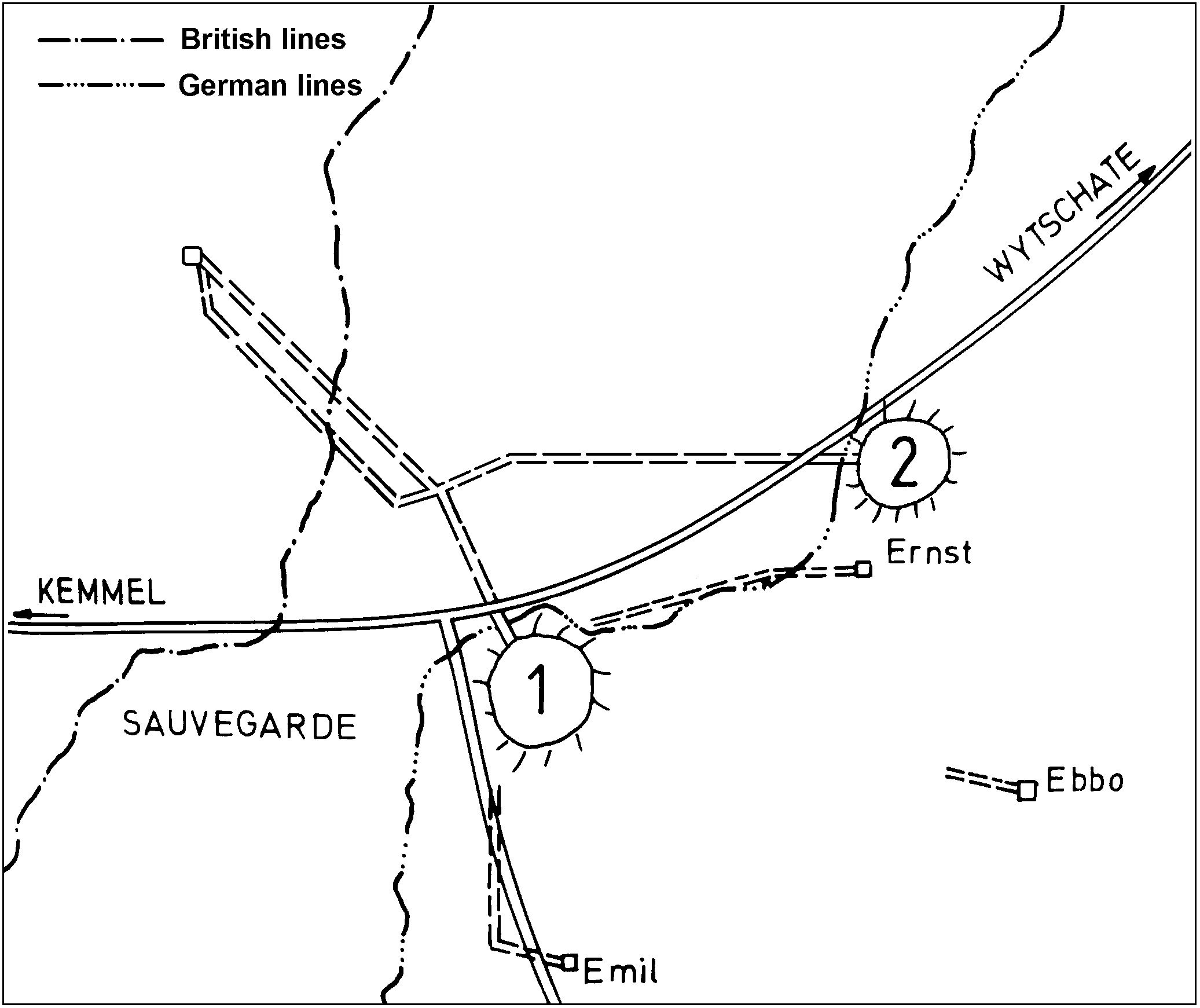
Plan for the British Peckham deep mine, one of the Mines in the Battle of Messines (1917), with German counter-mining efforts (shafts Ebbo, Emil and Ernst).

Early tunnelling required a great deal of improvisation, as equipment was in short supply. This made tunnels shallow, the noise of digging being detectable using simple devices in the trenches, even amongst the gun-fire. In the trenches, soldiers found that driving a stick into the ground and holding the other end between their teeth enabled them to feel any underground vibration. Another method involved sinking a water-filled oil drum into the floor of the trench, with lookout soldiers taking turns to lower an ear into the water to listen for vibrations. Improvised methods later included Water Board inspector short-sticks, each with a single vibrating wire-type earphone attached, or using filled French water-bottles laid flat on their sides in pairs, so they could be listened-to through medical stethoscopes.

Underground, within the tunnelling operations, side-shaft listening posts were deployed and manned by soldiers whose job entailed listening for indications that the enemy was tunnelling. Initially using just manual methods, the British were eventually equipped with the Geophone, which could detect noises up to 50 metres (160 ft) away. Employing two Geophones, a listener was able to ascertain the direction of hostile activity by moving the sensors until sound levels were equal in both ears. A compass bearing was then taken. When gauging distance only, both earpieces were plugged into a single sensor; this was a skill only gained by experience. Deploying listeners in different tunnels in triangulation techniques, by the end of 1916 the scale of British tunnelling warfare had expanded to such an extent that there were not enough listeners to man every post; central listening stations were devised. Working electronically like a telephone exchange, the signals from up to 36 remote sensors (Tele-geophones and Seismomicrophones) could be distinguished and logged by just two men.

=== Underground tactics ===
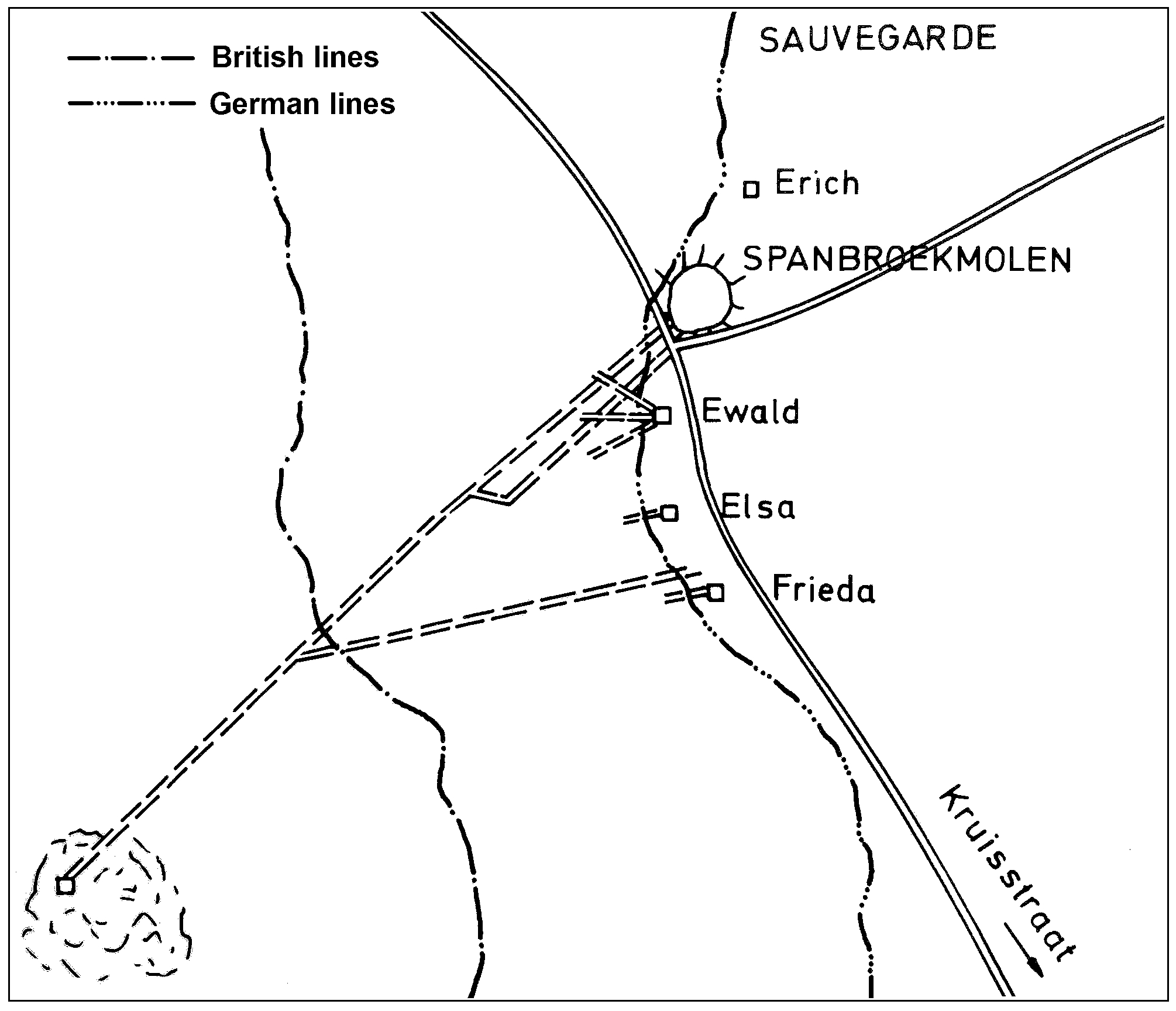
Plan for the British Spanbroekmolen deep mine, one of the Mines in the Battle of Messines (1917), with German counter-mining efforts (shafts Erich, Ewald, Elsa and Frieda).

The tunnellers developed counter tactics, which both sides deployed. The first was the use of large mines placed in one's own tunnels – some actually dug towards enemy noise to create damage – which when exploded would create fissures and cracks in the ground, making the ground either unsuitable for tunnelling or destroying existing tunnels and works. A small device, called the camouflet, created a localised underground chamber designed not to break the surface and form craters, but to destroy a strictly limited area of underground territory – and its occupants. The second tactic, deployed when the enemy tunnel was too close to your existing works or trenches, was the deployment of rod-fed torpedo shaped camouflet charges. Effectively land mines on the end of long iron sticks, the technique was a defensive tactic against an immediate threat. Towards the end of the tunnel war, forces also deployed mines at greater depths, which, coupled with the use of listening devices, could be exploded away from friendly trenches as a defensive measure.

== British advantages ==
The British tunnellers had three advantages over their German counterparts, the Pioniere:

Firstly, the British used clay-kicking which was a virtually silent method of tunnelling. The Germans did not know of this technique, having not used it in their pre-war civil engineering, and thus used mattocks (a type of pick-axe) and other loud tools throughout the war. This made their tunnels more vulnerable to detection and attack.

Secondly, the use of clay-kicking made the British four times as fast at tunnel digging as their German counterparts.

Thirdly, British positions were most often located in low-lying areas, while German positions tended to be more elevated. Although this made the British more vulnerable to shelling, it also meant that British tunnellers had less of the soft quicksand-like 'Kemmel Sands' (known to the Germans as Schwimmsande), an integral component of the geological make-up of the ridges around Ypres, to penetrate. While the bottom blue clay layer was virtually flat, as was the Kemmel Sands that sat on top of it, there was a dry strata which varied above this which created the geographical contours. This varying dry strata increased pressure on the Kemmel Sands, which unable to egress water below them, made them wet and unstable. When punctured, the Kemmel Sands would often "spout" under pressure, both water and solid material. Difficult to dig through and keep the mining wooden structure stable, the Germans, assuming that the British had the same instability problem, dug few tunnels until 1916. The British found an engineering solution by creating a metal tube through the Kemmel Sands. Sunk either through its own weight or by the use of hydraulic jacks, once the blue clay layer was hit, the tunnelling could again resume under wooden supports. In autumn of 1915, 172nd Tunnelling Company at St Eloi managed to sink shafts through the sandy clay at a depth of 7.0 metres (23 ft) down to dry blue clay at a depth of 13 metres (43 ft), which was ideal for tunneling, from where they continued to drive galleries towards the German lines at a depth of 18 metres (60 ft). This constituted a major achievement in mining technique and gave the Royal Engineers a significant advantage over their German counterparts.

The British used tube shafts from May 1915, a full year before the Germans, who when they did start to use metal and concrete tunnels, had lost the strategic advantage and were digging purely for defensive purposes.

== Operations ==
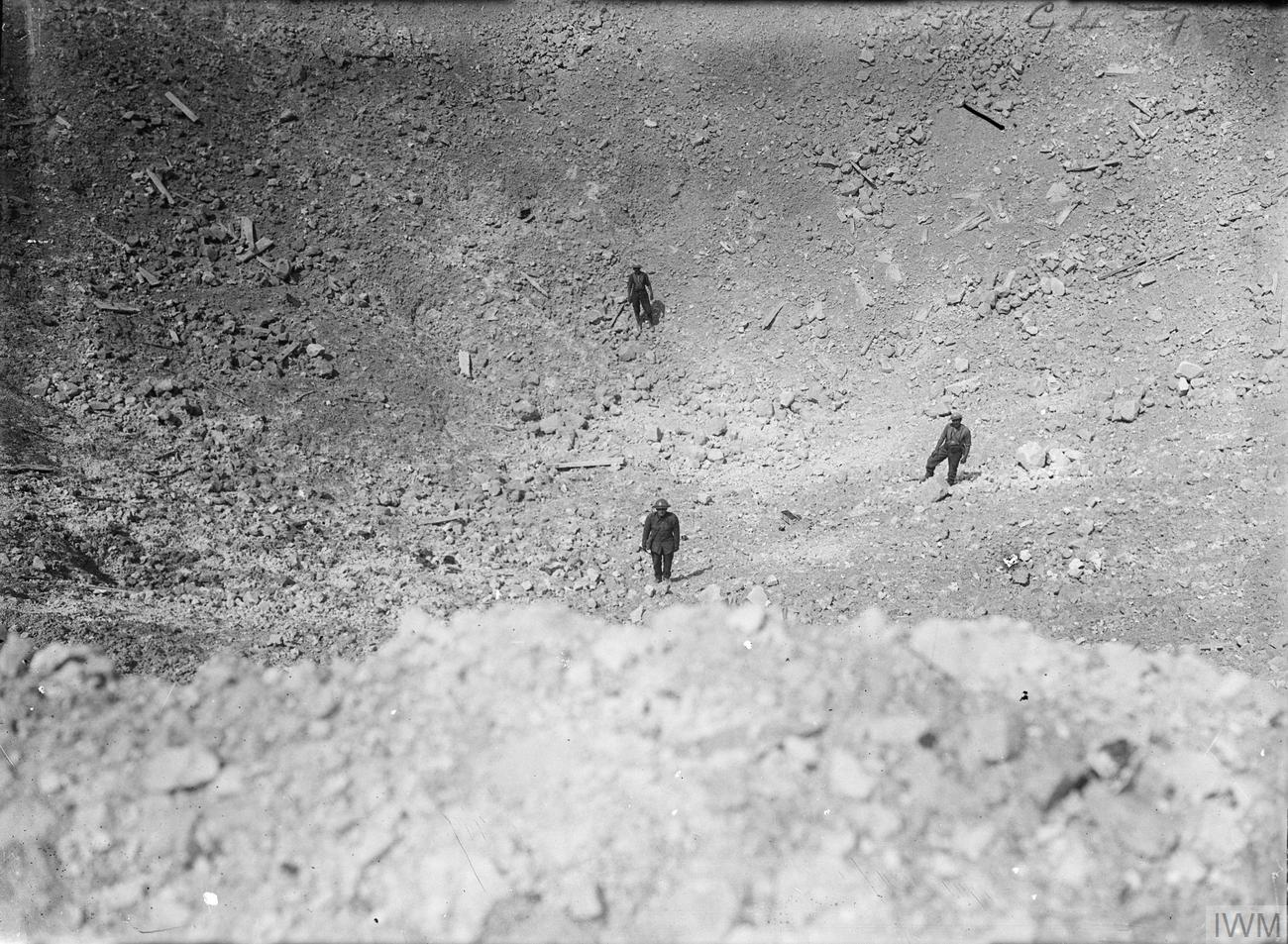
La Boisselle mine crater, August 1916 (IWM Q 912)

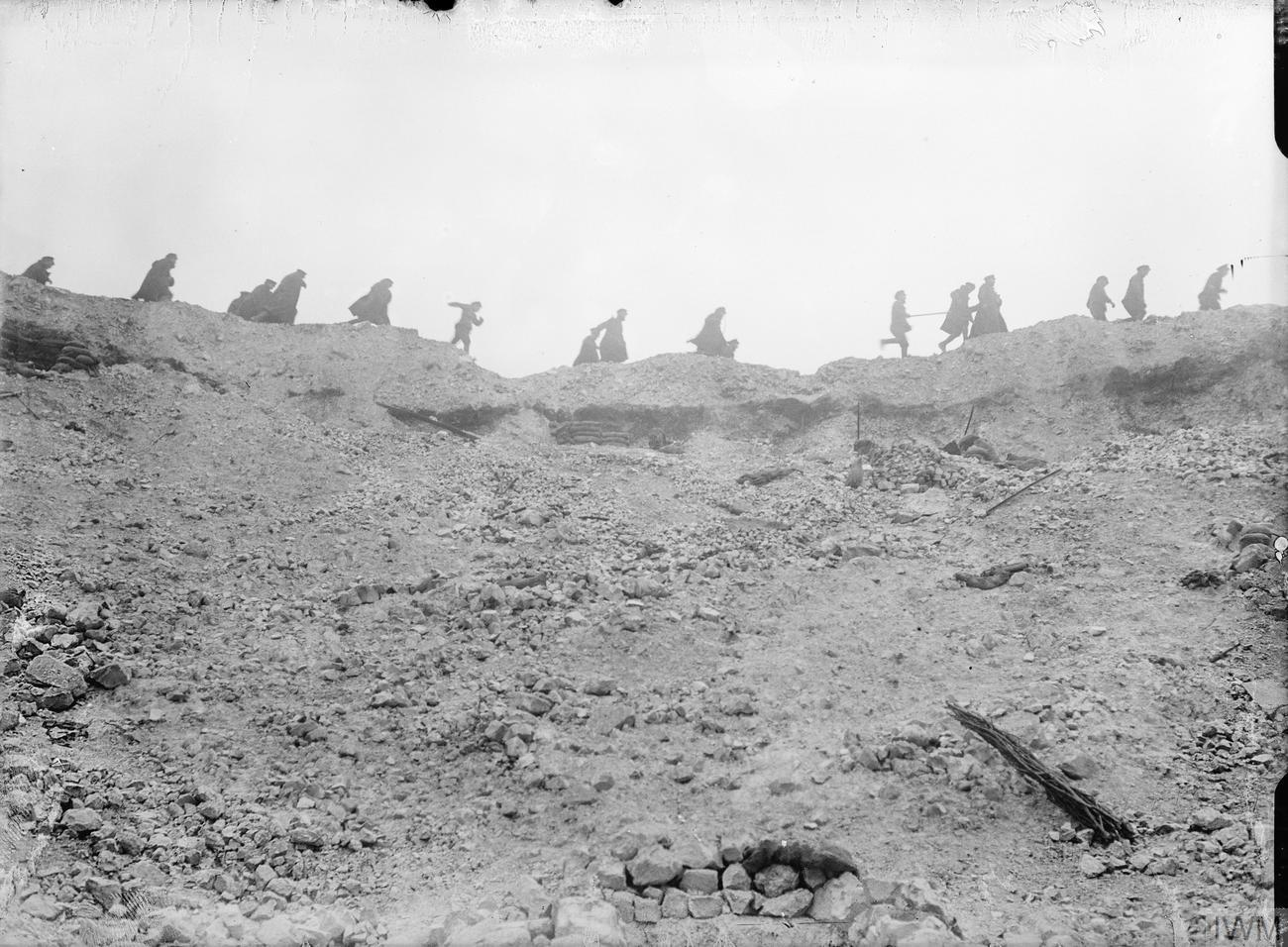
Troops passing Lochnagar Crater, October 1916 (IWM Q 1479)

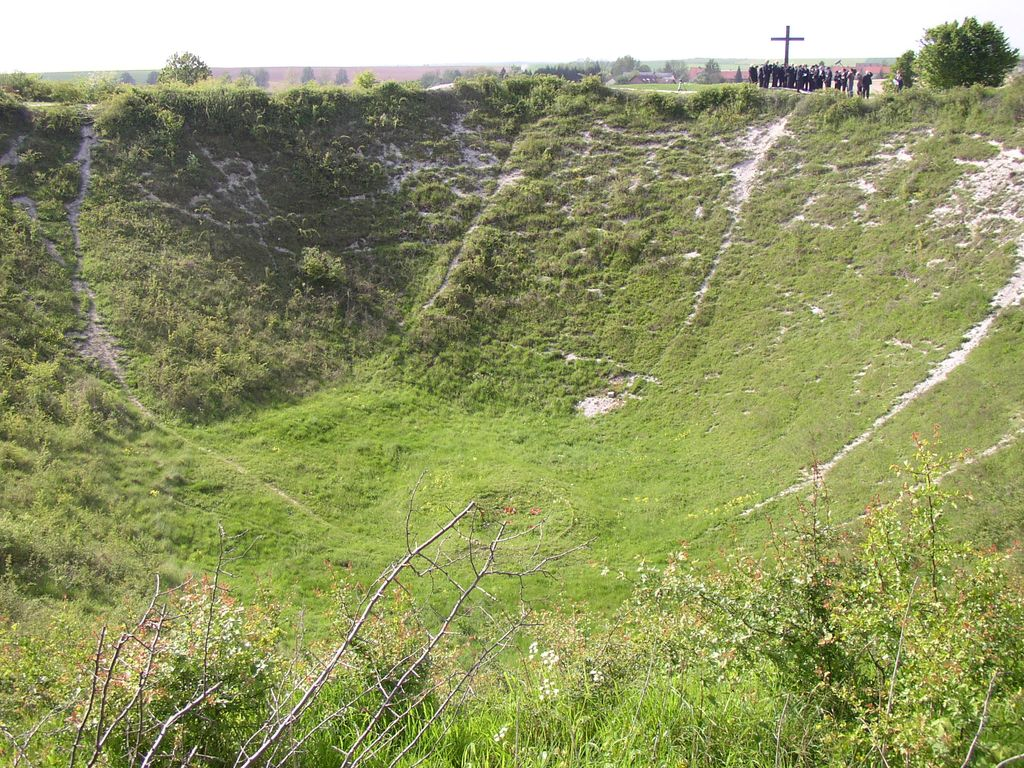
The Lochnagar Crater, one of the mines fired on the first day of the Somme

Tunnelling companies were not popular amongst the ordinary troops. Knowing such a unit was nearby made them nervous:

- Danger from above the ground (from the enemy)
- Danger from below the ground (from their own and enemy tunnelling companies)
- If the enemy knew a tunnelling company was in the area, it made the trench troops a more likely artillery target. This was further emphasised as the war developed with both sides using larger and larger mines, often deployed ever-closer to their own trenches. These were more likely not to be detonated on time, or if they did, shower debris over their own trenches and advancing troops, causing increased casualties.

The first British mine to be detonated was by the 173rd Tunnelling Company at Hill 60 (10 April 1915). Mines were also used at The Bluff, St Eloi (six on 27 March 1916), the Battle of Aubers Ridge (May 1915); Hooge, Givenchy, Cuinchy and the Battle of Loos (September 1915).

In June 1916, during the height of the underground war on the Western Front, British tunnellers fired 101 mines or camouflets, while German tunnellers fired 126 mines or camouflets. This amounts to a total of 227 mine explosions in one month – one detonation every three hours. The last British deep mine of the First World War was fired by 251st Tunnelling Company at Givenchy (10 August 1917).

=== Hooge and Mont Sorrel ===
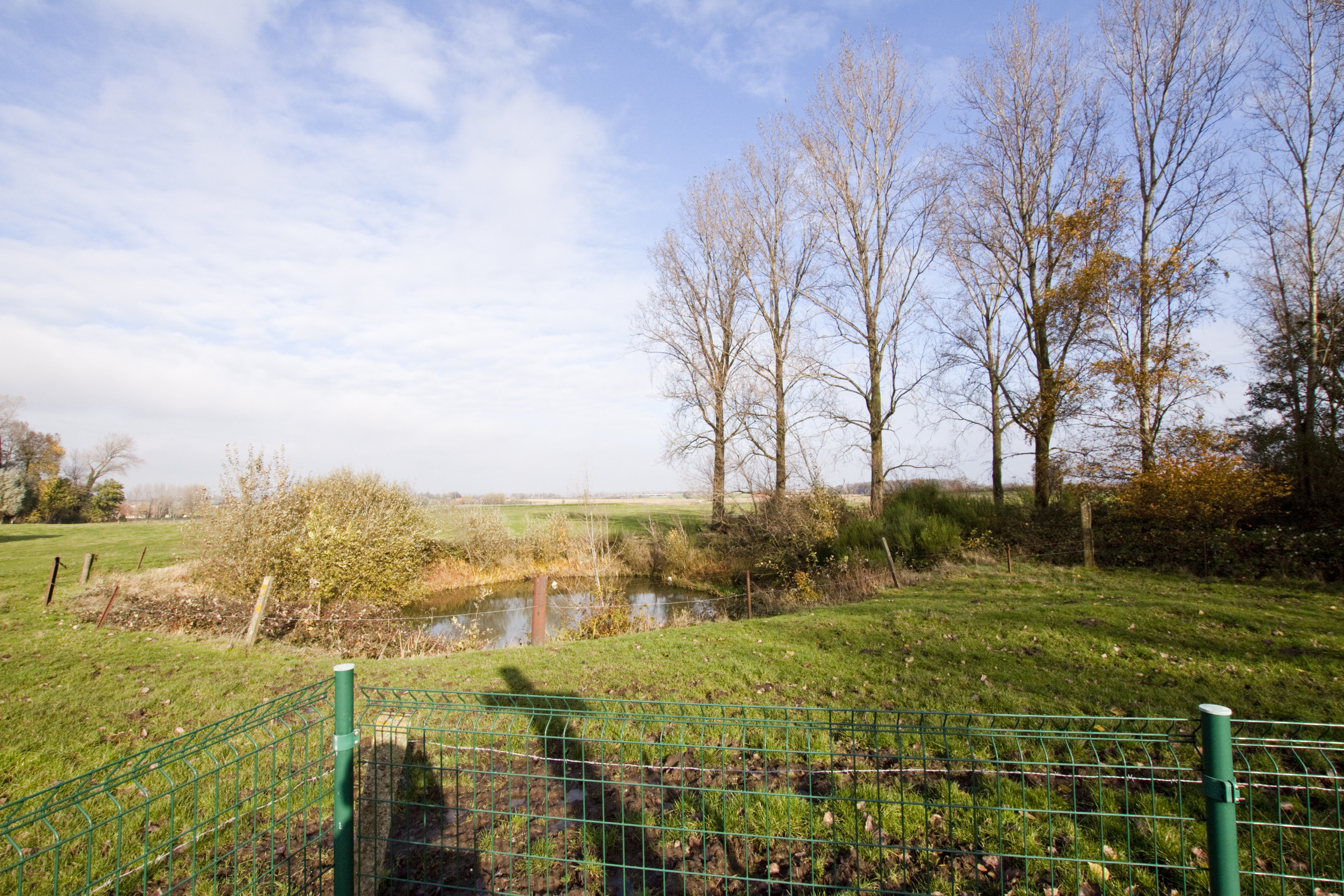
Mine crater at Railway Wood near Hooge, located just behind the Royal Engineers tunnellers' grave

The small village of Hooge in Flanders belonged to one of the easternmost sectors of the Ypres Salient, which made it the site of intense and sustained fighting between German and Allied forces. From 1914 the front line of the Salient ran through the Hooge area. There was almost constant fighting in the area over the next three years, and Hooge changed hands a number of times. The château at Hooge was used as the British divisional headquarters for the area for some time; several senior officers from the 1st and 2nd Divisions were killed when the Château de Hooge was shelled on 31 October 1914. German forces attacked the château between 24 May and 3 June 1915 and despite the detonation of a mine by the 175th Tunnelling Company (operating with the 3rd Division) on 19 July, leaving a massive crater, took control of the château and the surrounding area on 30 July 1915. The château and the crater (craters being strategically important in relatively flat countryside), were taken by the British 6th Division on 9 August. It was reclaimed by the Germans on 16 June 1916 and retaken by the British on 31 July 1917 when the 8th Division managed to advance past it by about a mile. The Germans retook the site in April 1918 as part of the Spring Offensive but were expelled from the area by the British on 28 September as the offensive faltered. The chateau was completely destroyed along with the entire village; several large craters were blown over the course of the 1917 fighting.

=== Battle of the Somme ===
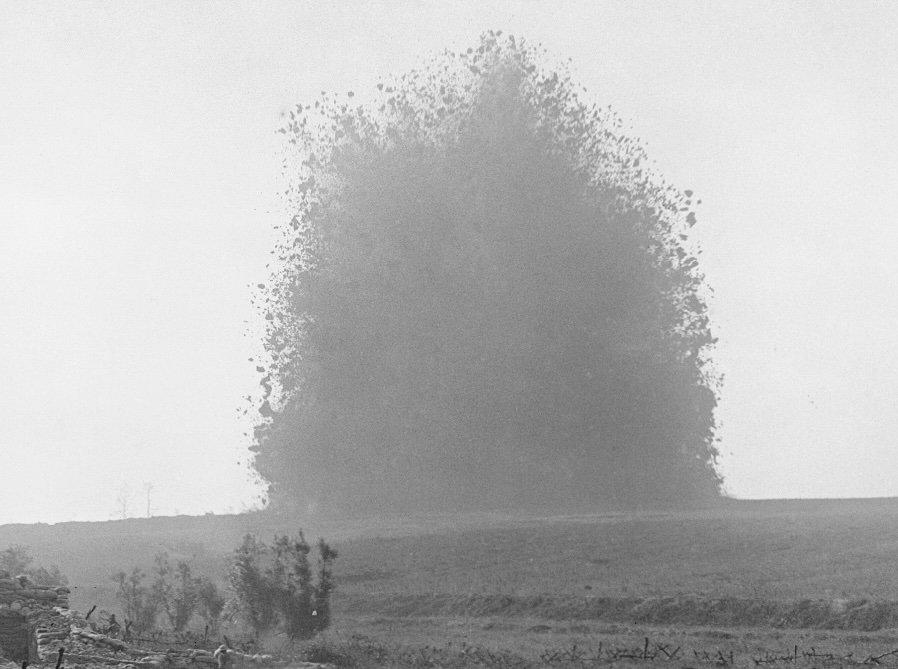
The explosion of the mine beneath the Hawthorn Ridge Redoubt, 1 July 1916. Photo by Ernest Brooks.

In the Somme sector of the Western Front, local but very fierce underground fighting had taken place in the winter of 1914 and spring of 1915 at La Boisselle, Fricourt, Bois Français and Carnoy. As part of the Allied preparations for the Battle of the Somme (1 July – 18 November 1916), the tunnelling companies of the Royal Engineers made two major contributions to the opening attack: Firstly, they placed a number of mines beneath the German front lines, laid deep in the chalk and overcharged to throw up high lips for screening and to give advantage to the attackers when (or if) they captured them. Secondly, they prepared a series of shallow Russian saps from the British front line into no man's land, which would be opened at Zero Hour and allow the infantry to attack the German positions from a comparatively short distance. Thirdly, members of the 183rd company also dug a tunnel for a Livens Large Gallery Flame Projector, one of 4 installed in preparation for the battle.

For the start of the battle on 1 July 1916, the Royal Engineers planned to fire a group of eight large and eleven small mines along the Somme front line. The most important of them were beneath Hawthorn Ridge Redoubt at Beaumont-Hamel, beneath a German field fortification known as Schwabenhöhe just south of La Boisselle and three in a sector named The Tambour near Fricourt. The Hawthorn Ridge Redoubt mine, which consisted of 40,000 pounds (18,000 kg) of explosives, was the first to be detonated. This led to the successful filming of the explosion by British cinematographer Geoffrey Malins, who was filming the 29th Division's attack on that day. Despite their colossal size, the largest of the mines fired on 1 July 1916 failed to help sufficiently neutralise the German defences. At La Boisselle, the ruined village was meant to fall in 20 minutes, but by the end of the first day of the battle, it had not been taken while the III Corps divisions had lost more than 11,000 casualties. At Mash Valley, the attackers lost 5,100 men before noon, and at Sausage Valley near the crater of the Lochnagar mine, there were over 6,000 casualties – the highest concentration on the entire battlefield. The III Corps' 34th Division suffered the worst losses of any unit that day.

=== Battle of Messines ===
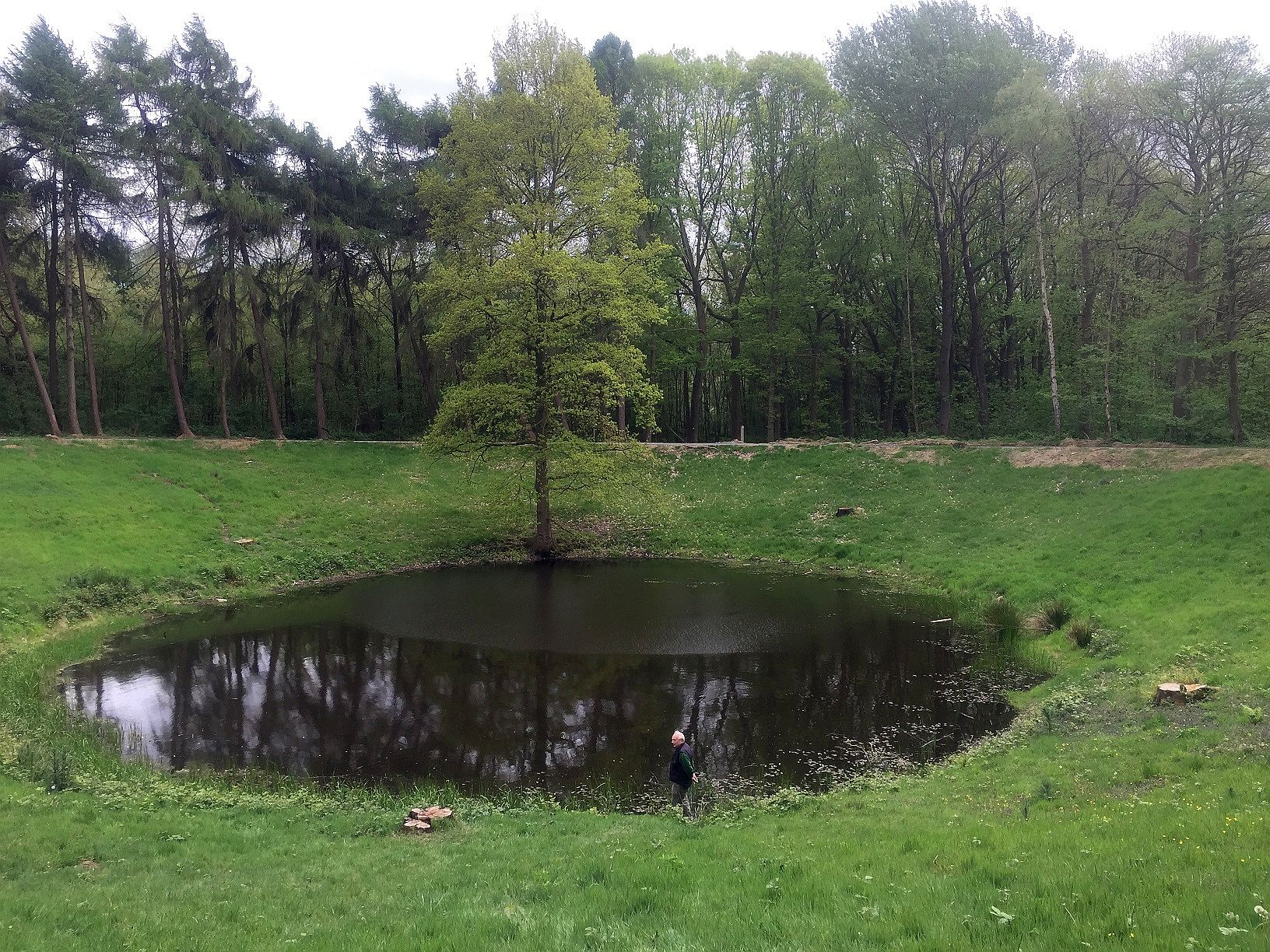
Crater of the Caterpillar mine detonated as part of the Mines in the Battle of Messines (1917)

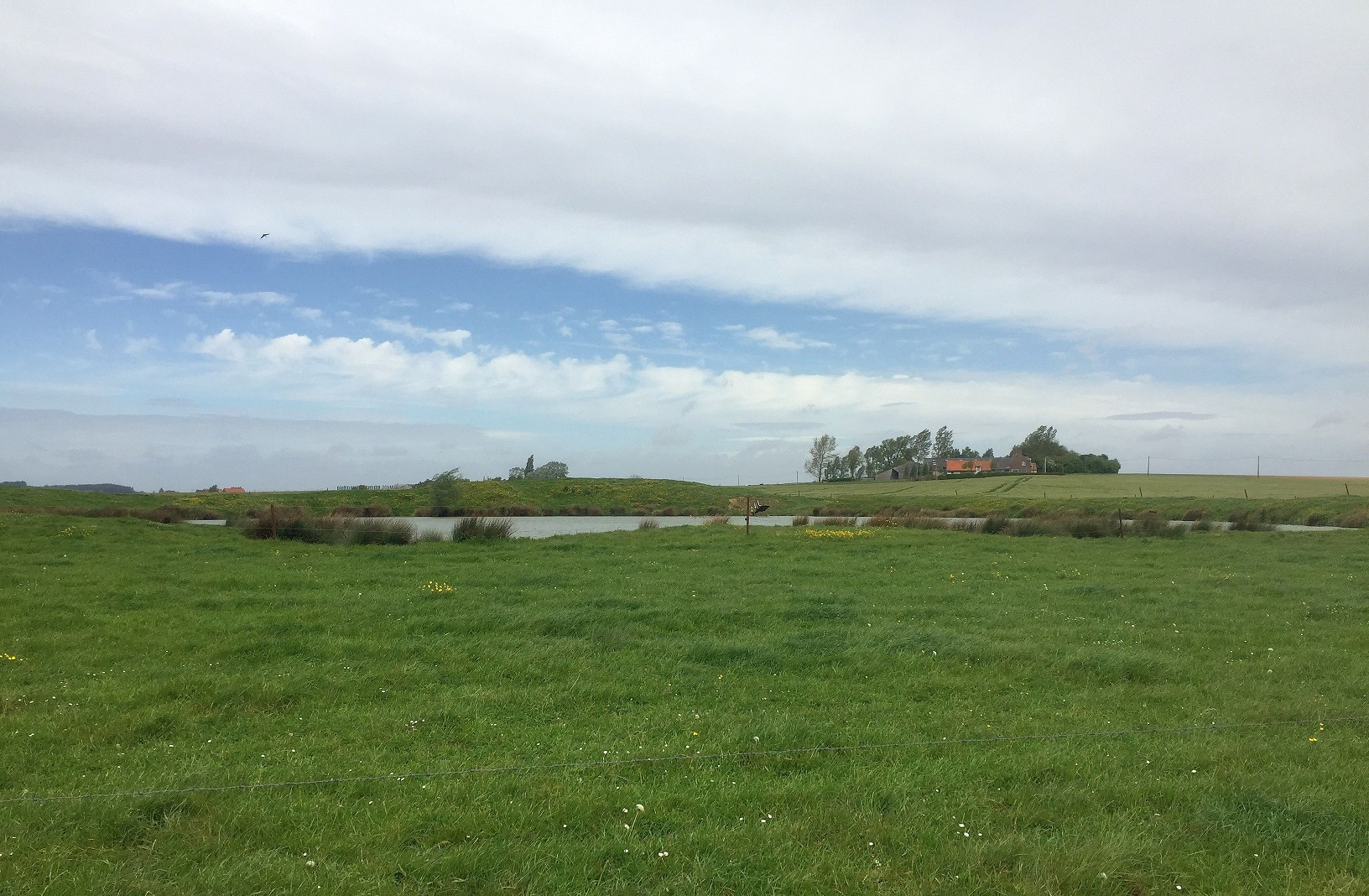
View from the Kruisstraat craters towards the Spanbroekmolen crater, all detonated as part of the Mines in the Battle of Messines (1917)

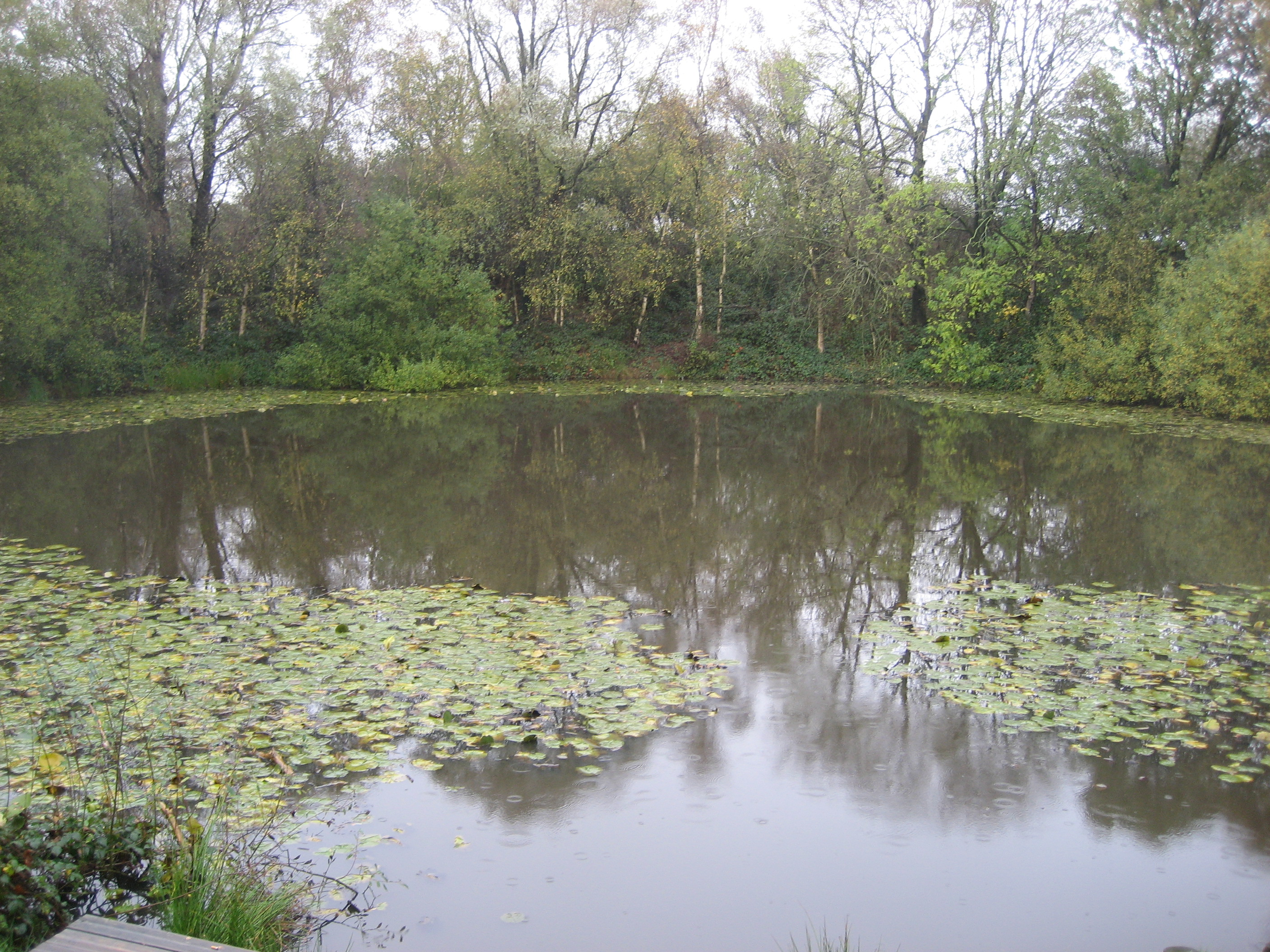
Spanbroekmolen crater in November 2009. It is also known as "Lone Tree Crater" or "Pool of Peace".

In January 1917, General Sir Herbert Plumer, gave orders for a series of mines to be placed under the German lines in preparation for the Battle of Messines.

These were not the first mines in the Ypres Salient. From 1915, British engineers started digging, but it was not until the winter of 1916 when they were joined by Canadian, Australian and New Zealand engineers, that mass tunnelling started under the German trenches. At St Eloi, six mines were detonated on 27 March 1916. At Hill 60, a gallery was started in summer 1915 and known as Berlin Tunnel. The 1st Australian Tunnelling Company took over mining operations at Hill 60 in November 1916, led in part by Captain Oliver Woodward. Twenty-six deep mines were eventually dug in preparation of the Battle of Messines in 1917, some up to 2,160 feet (660 m) long and up to 125 feet (38 m) deep, altogether containing 600 tonnes of ammonal explosive. To solve the problem of wet soil, the tunnels were dug in the layer of "blue clay", 80–120 feet (25–30 m) below the surface. The galleries dug in order to lay these mines eventually totalled over 8,000 yards (7,300 m) in length, and had been constructed in the face of tenacious German counter-mining. On several occasions, German tunnellers were within yards of large British mine "chambers." The mine at Petite Douve Farm was discovered by the Germans on 24 August 1916 and destroyed by a counter-mine.

With doubts about the reliability of the system (some mines had been lying underground for over a year), soldiers waiting in the trenches had been warned that they could not depend absolutely on the mines working as planned, so their orders were to leave their trenches and attack whether the mines exploded or not. The explosion of the mines took place at 03:10 on 7 June 1917. Approximately 10,000 German troops were killed when the mines were simultaneously detonated, creating 19 large craters and an explosion so loud it was heard by British Prime Minister David Lloyd George in his study in 10 Downing Street in London. There is even a report of an insomniac student hearing it in University College Dublin. The evening before the attack, General Sir Charles Harington remarked to his staff, "Gentlemen, we may not make history tomorrow, but we shall certainly change the geography."

The largest of the mines at Messines was at St Eloi, dug by the 1st Canadian Tunnelling Company, consisting of 95,600 pounds (43,400 kg) of explosive. This allowed the capture of St Eloi by the British 41st Division. Another large mine was at Spanbroekmolen. Found and counter-mined by the Germans a few weeks before the attack, the British were forced to dig a second entrance tunnel into the already prepared explosive chamber, (which consisted of 41 tons of ammonal explosive 88 feet (27 m) below ground), to reconnect the detonation wires. Although tested fully just a few hours before the attack, officers used torch batteries to prove the circuits. As instructed, soldiers of the 36th (Ulster) Division had already left their trenches and begun to move across No-Man's Land when the mine exploded a few seconds late, leading to some being killed by falling debris. They are buried in Lone Tree Cemetery nearby. The "Lone Tree Crater" formed by the blast was approximately 250 feet (76 m) in diameter, and 40 feet (12 m) deep.

Four mines close to Ploegsteert Wood (Birdcage 1–4) were not exploded as they were outside the attack area. The British intended to dismantle the remaining mines, but the Third Battle of Ypres delayed operations, after the Germans overran the group headquarters their location was lost. On 17 July 1955, a lightning strike set-off one of the remaining mines. There were no human casualties, but one cow was killed and some local property damage was sustained. The remaining mines with several tonnes of high explosive are still buried under the Belgian countryside. A memorial to the Australian mining troops killed at Hill 60 during the course of the war was later placed at the site.

=== Battle of Vimy Ridge ===
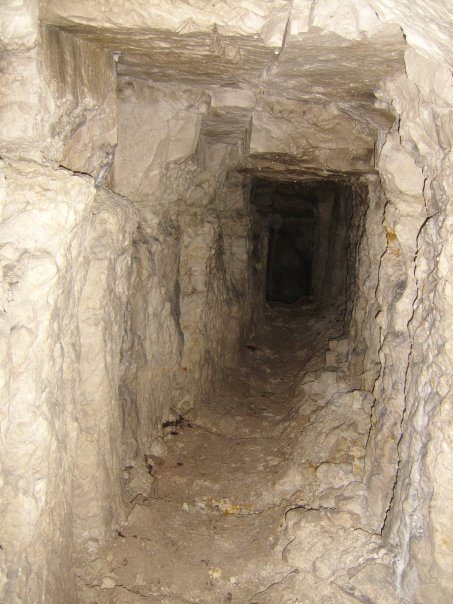
A preserved World War 1 fighting tunnel in the Vimy sector

Between October 1915 and April 1917 an estimated 150 French, British and German charges were fired in this 7 kilometres (4.3 mi) sector of the Western Front. The tunnelling companies of the Royal Engineers progressively took over from the French between February and May 1916. The units active around Vimy were the 172nd, 175th, 176th, 182nd, 184th, 185th and 255th Tunnelling Companies.

The British soon discovered that German tunnelling companies had taken advantage of the relative calm on the surface to build an extensive network of tunnels and deep mines from which they could attack French positions. The Royal Engineers immediately deployed tunnelling companies of the Royal Engineers along the front to combat the German mining operations. In response to increased British mining, German artillery and trench mortar fire intensified in early May 1916. After September 1916, when the Royal Engineers had constructed defensive galleries along most of the front line at Vimy, offensive mining largely ceased. By 1917, 19 crater groups existed along this section of the Western Front, each with several large craters. The British gallery network beneath Vimy Ridge grew to a length of 12 kilometres (7.5 mi).

Before the Battle of Vimy Ridge (9–12 April 1917), the British tunnelling companies secretly laid a series of explosive charges under German positions in an effort to destroy surface fortifications before the assault. The original plan had called for 17 mines and 9 Wombat charges to support the infantry attack, of which 13 (possibly 14) mines and 8 Wombat charges were eventually laid. In order to assess the consequences of infantry having to advance across cratered ground after a mining attack, officers from the Canadian Corps visited La Boisselle and Fricourt where the mines on the first day of the Somme had been blown. Their reports and the experience of the Canadians at St Eloi in April 1916 – where mines had so altered and damaged the landscape as to render occupation of the mine craters by the infantry all but impossible –, led to the decision to remove offensive mining from the central sector allocated to the Canadian Corps at Vimy Ridge. In the end, two mines were blown before the attack, while three mines and two Wombat charges were fired to support the attack, including those forming a northern flank.

== End of mining operations ==
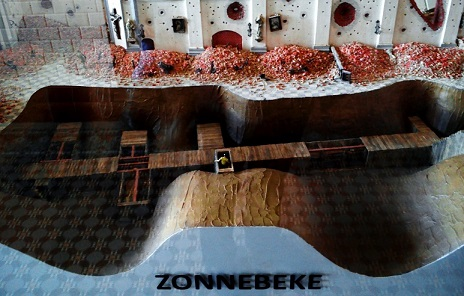
Model of the Zonnebeke Church Dugout, one of the shelters constructed by 171st Tunnelling Company at Zonnebeke near Ypres

From Spring 1917 the whole war became more mobile, with grand offensives at the Battles of Arras, Messines and Passchendaele, there was no longer a place for a tactic that depended upon total immobility for its employment. As the tactics and counter-tactics required deeper and deeper tunnelling, (hence more time and requiring more stable front lines), offensive and defensive military mining largely ceased. The last mine fired by the British in the First World War was near Givenchy on 10 August 1917.

Even after mine warfare had stopped, underground work continued, with the tunnellers concentrating on deep dugouts for troop accommodation, safe from the larger shells being deployed.

According to the original trench maps, hospitals, mess rooms, chapels, kitchens, workshops, blacksmiths, as well as bedrooms where exhausted soldiers could rest, were hewn from the blue-clay and stone. Connected by corridors measuring 6 ft 6in high by 4 ft wide, they were fitted with water pumps which, when the troops left within weeks of the war ending, were slowly submerged. The developments at Hill 60 housed 3,000 men, those near Hooge 1,000. The Vampire dugout, a brigade headquarters built by 171st Tunnelling Company near Zonnebeke, was captured and occupied by the Germans in their Spring Offensive in 1918, before being retaken in September. The level of activity can be gauged by the fact that during 1917 and 1918, more people lived underground in the Ypres area than reside in the town today. About 180 dugout sites have been located in the Ypres Salient and in the 1990s some of them were entered, at least in part.

=== Battle of Arras ===
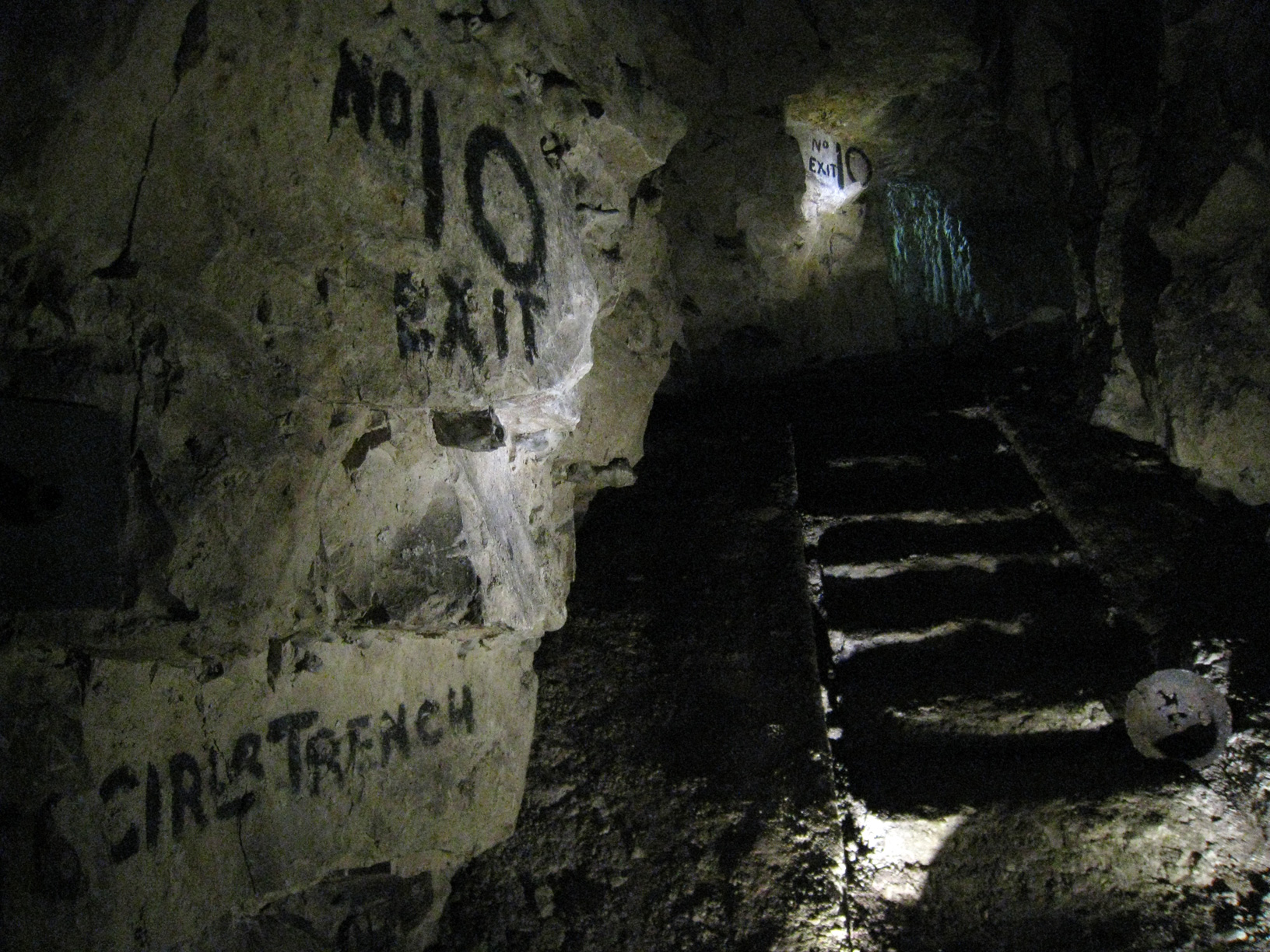
Exit from the Allied military tunnels in the Carrière Wellington

In preparation for the Battle of Arras in 1917, the Royal Engineers had been working underground from October 1916, constructing tunnels for the troops. The Arras region is chalky and therefore easily excavated; under Arras itself there is a vast network of caverns (called the boves), which consist of underground quarries, galleries and sewage tunnels. The engineers devised a plan to add new tunnels to this network so that troops could arrive at the battlefield in secrecy and in safety. The scale of this undertaking was enormous: in one sector alone four Tunnel Companies (of 500 men each) worked around the clock in 18-hour shifts for two months.

The British attack plan was well developed, drawing on the lessons of the Somme and Verdun in the previous year. Rather than attacking on an extended front, the full weight of artillery fire would be concentrated on a relatively narrow stretch of 24 miles (39 km). The barrage was planned to last about a week at all points on the line, with a much longer and heavier bombardment at Vimy to weaken its strong defences. During the assault, the troops would advance in open formation, with units leapfrogging each other in order to allow them time to consolidate and regroup. Before the action could be undertaken, a great deal of preparation was required, much of it innovative.

To assist the attack, the Royal Engineers constructed 20 kilometres (12 mi) of tunnels, graded as subways (foot traffic only); tramways (with rails for hand-drawn trollies for taking ammunition to the line and bringing casualties back); and railways (a light railway system). Just before the assault the tunnel system had grown big enough to conceal 24,000 men, with electric lighting provided by its own small powerhouse, as well as kitchens, latrines and a medical centre with a fully equipped operating theatre. The bulk of the work was done by New Zealanders, including Māori and Pacific Islanders from the New Zealand (Māori) Pioneer Battalion, and Bantams from the mining towns of Northern England.

Assault tunnels were also dug, stopping a few yards short of the German line, ready to be blown open by explosives on Zero-Day. In addition to this, conventional mines were dug under the front lines, ready to be blown immediately before the assault. Many were never detonated for fear that they would churn up the ground too much. In the meantime, German sappers were actively conducting their own underground operations, seeking out Allied tunnels to assault and counter-mine. Of the New Zealand Tunnelling Company alone, 41 died and 151 were wounded as a result of German counter-mining.

Today, most of the tunnels and trenches are off-limits to the public for reasons of safety. A 250-metre portion of the Grange Subway at Vimy Ridge is open to the public from May to November and the Wellington tunnel was opened to the public as the Carrière Wellington museum in March 2008.

=== Second Battle of Passchendaele ===
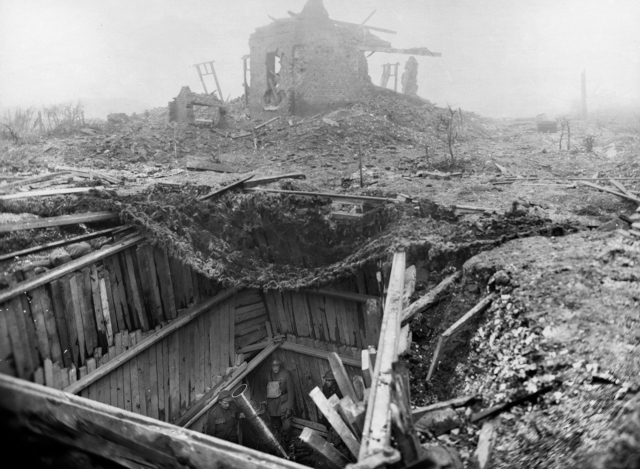
A heavy trench mortar emplacement, constructed by No. 2 Section of the 3rd Australian Tunnelling Company

In preparation for the Second Battle of Passchendaele, as early as the 17 October, assault units were given all available details about the German defences in their respective sectors, in order to facilitate early planning. Intelligence officers and artillery observers worked jointly in observation posts recording newly built German fortifications as well as those that had previously escaped notice, permitting the artillery to take necessary action before the offensive. To improve the logistical movement of artillery and supplies an extensive programme of road building was started. Ten field companies, seven tunnelling companies, four army troop companies and nine battalions were put to work repairing or extending existing plank roads. From the middle of October until the end of the offensive, a total of 2 miles (3.2 km) of double plank road and more than 4,000 yards (3,700 m) of heavy tram line was constructed in the Canadian Corps area. Brigadier General Edward Morrison, commanding the artillery, also secured permission to use the roads to the rear for withdrawing disabled guns for repair.

== Remains and memorials ==
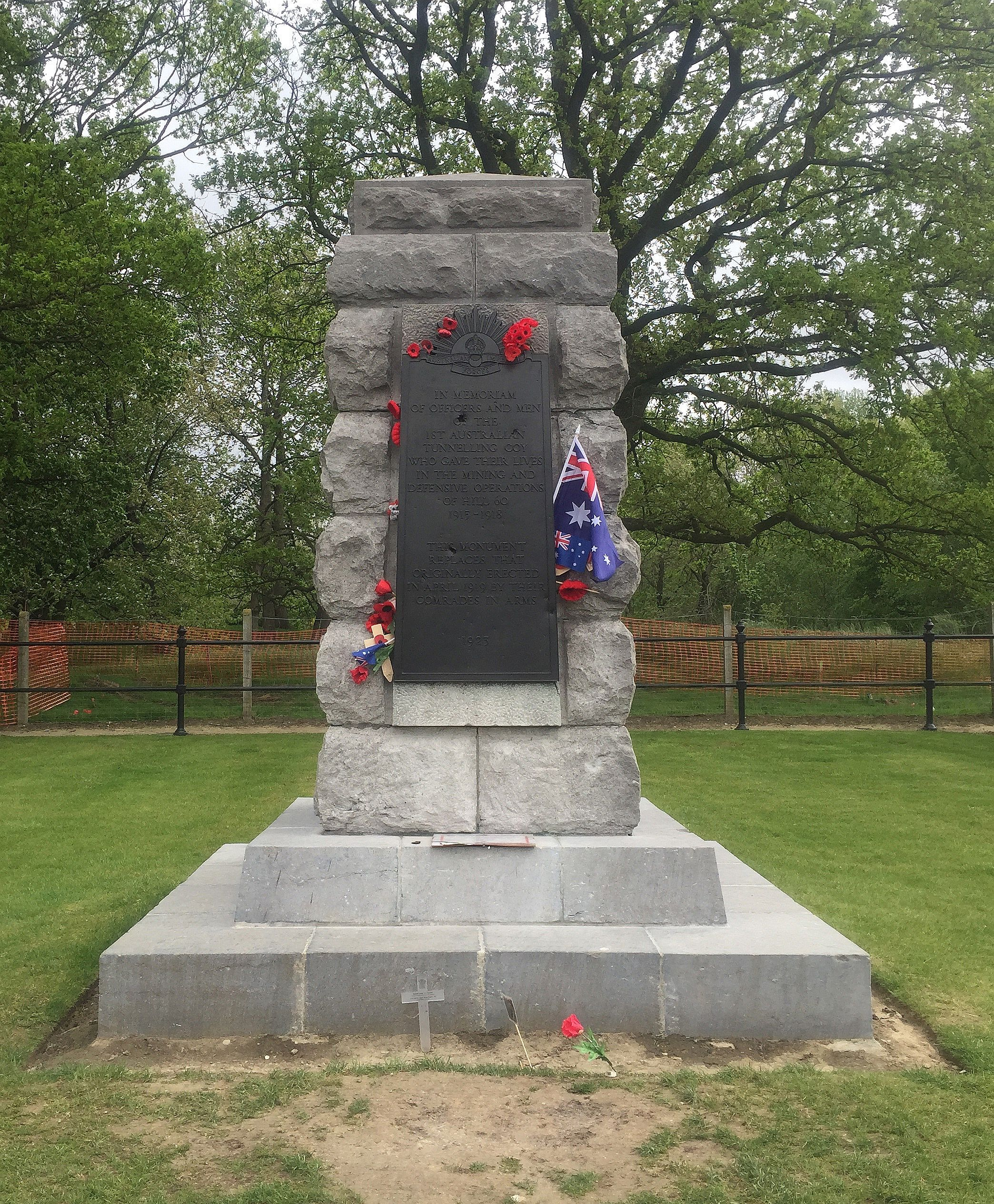
1st Australian Tunnelling Company Memorial at Hill 60 (Ypres)

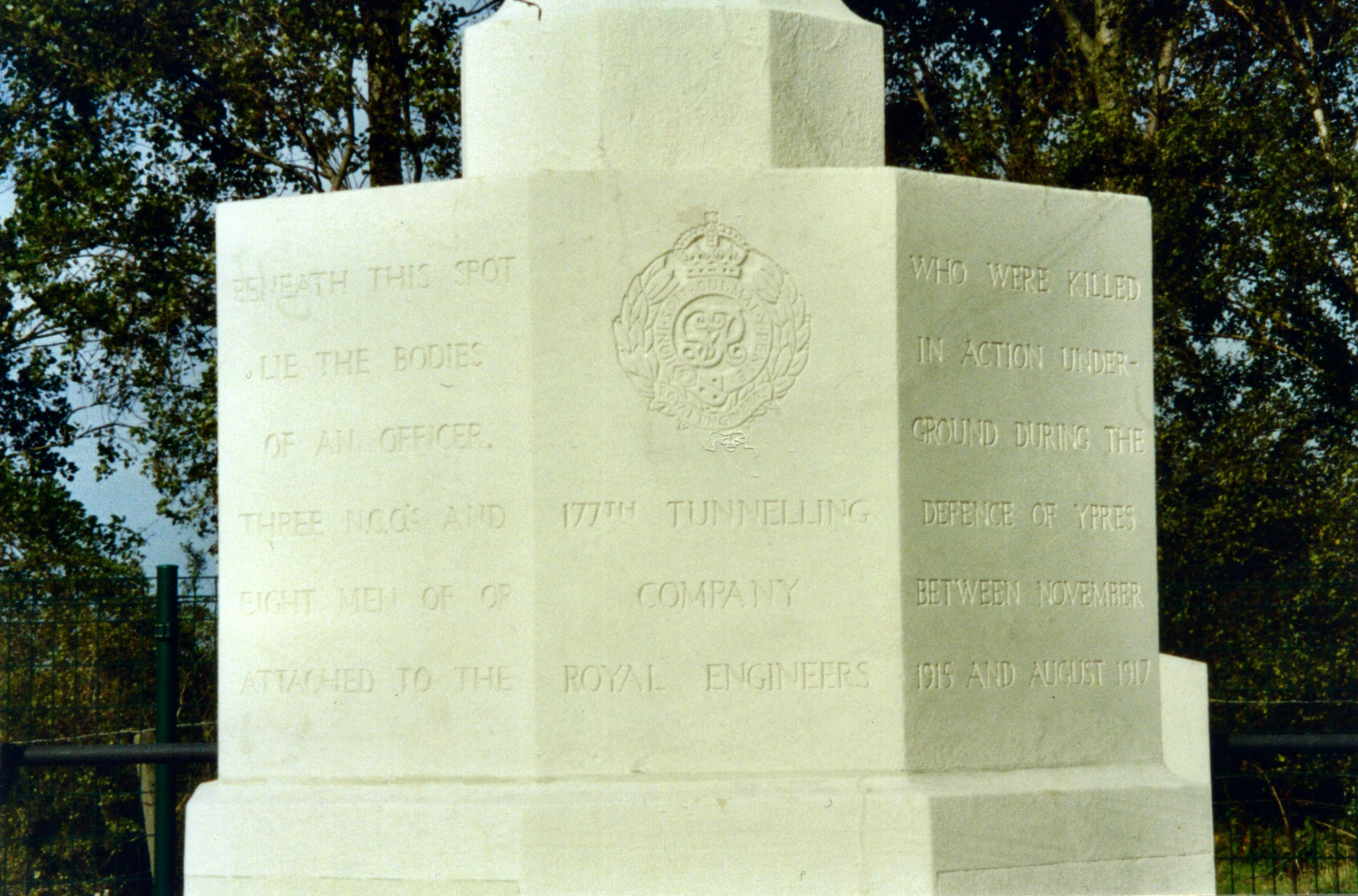
The inscription on the base of the Cross of Sacrifice at RE Grave Railway Wood.

Many of the largest craters have been left, often too large to fill-in, even today. The largest crater on the Western Front, the Lochnagar Crater, had been left for 50 years, but it had begun to be used by motorbikers and as a rubbish dump. Privately purchased in 1979, it is now a recognized 1914–1918 historic battlefield site.

Around Ypres, some large craters remain near Hooge, as do several of the craters created by the mines in the Battle of Messines, including those at St Eloi (created by a charge of 95,600 pounds (43,400 kg) of ammonal), Maedelstede Farm (created by a charge of 94,000 pounds (43,000 kg) of ammonal), and at Spanbroekmolen (created by a charge of 91,000 pounds (41,000 kg) ammonal). When detonated on 7 June 1917, the blast at Spanbroekmolen formed the "Lone Tree Crater" with a diameter of 250 feet (76 m) and a depth of 40 feet (12 m). The crater was acquired in 1929 by the Toc H foundation in Poperinge and is today recognized as the Pool of Peace memorial.

In a little square just outside Wijtschate church stands the 'Memorial to the British Miners of World War One' who were engaged in underground war beneath the Messines Ridge. The bronze statue depicts a young miner in a kneeling position, working with a pickaxe (photo).

The Royal Engineers grave at Railway Wood on the Bellewaerde Ridge near Zillebeke, about 4 kilometres east of Ypres, marks the spot where eight Royal Engineers of the 177th Tunnelling Company and four attached infantrymen were killed between November 1915 and August 1917 whilst tunneling under the hill near Hooge. Their bodies were left in situ, beneath the hill on which the memorial now stands. One of the twelve men commemorated here is Second Lieutenant Charles Geoffrey Boothby (1894–1916), whose wartime letters to his girlfriend were published in 2005.

On a small square in the centre of Sint-Elooi stands the 'Monument to the St Eloi Tunnellers' which was unveiled on 11 November 2001. The brick plinth bears transparent plaques with details of the mining activities by 172nd Tunnelling Company and an extract from the poem Trenches: St Eloi by the war poet T.E. Hulme (1883–1917). There is a flagpole with the British flag next to it, and in 2003 an artillery gun was added to the memorial.

In Givenchy-lès-la-Bassée, the 'Tunnellers Memorial' commemorates the action on 26 June 1916 for which William Hackett of 254th Tunnelling Company was awarded the Victoria Cross. The memorial stands at the site of the Shaftesbury Shaft and the Red Dragon Crater. Its dimensions, 3.9 feet (120 cm) high and 2.6 feet (80 cm) wide, mirror the standard interior proportions of mine galleries constructed by the tunnelling companies in the Flanders clays. The memorial was designed by Peter Barton and unveiled on 19 June 2010.

== Awards ==
=== Victoria Cross ===
At least three men who served with the Tunnelling Companies were awarded the Victoria Cross, two of whom were members of tunneling units at the time of their VC action:

- Captain William Henry Johnston (1879–1915) won the Victoria Cross during the Race to the Sea in September 1914. He subsequently transferred to the Tunnelling Companies and in early 1915 he commanded 172nd Tunnelling Company at St Eloi in the Ypres Salient. His Victoria Cross is displayed at the Royal Engineers Museum, Chatham, Kent.
- Sapper William Hackett (1873–1916) of 254th Tunnelling Company, who was awarded the Victoria Cross posthumously for helping his fellow miners when a tunnel collapsed at Givenchy-lès-la-Bassée, France, on 26 June 1916. His medal is held by the Royal Engineers Museum. Hackett is commemorated on the Ploegsteert Memorial to the Missing and at the Tunnellers Memorial at Givenchy.
- Captain Coulson Norman Mitchell (1889–1978) of 1st Canadian Tunnelling Company operating with the 4th Canadian Division. He was awarded the Victoria Cross for preventing the demolition of bridges on the Canal de L'Escaut, north-east of Cambrai on 8–9 October 1918. His medal is held by the Canadian Military Engineers Museum, CFB Gagetown, New Brunswick.

=== Distinguished Conduct Medal ===
- Sam Gloade was awarded the Distinguished Conduct Medal for his service in the tunnelling company of the 6th Field Company and Battalion, Royal Canadian Engineers.
- Cpl George Smith 86462 176th Tunnelling Company was awarded a Distinguished Conduct Medal in 1916.

== Units ==
During the First World War, the tunnelling companies of the Royal Engineers comprised the following British and Commonwealth components:

- 170th Tunnelling Company (known for its role at the Hohenzollern Redoubt)
- 171st Tunnelling Company (known for creating the Vampire dugout)
- 172nd Tunnelling Company
- 173rd Tunnelling Company (the first Royal Engineer tunnelling company to fire mines on 17 April 1915)
- 174th Tunnelling Company
- 175th Tunnelling Company (known for its role at Hooge in 1915)
- 176th Tunnelling Company
- 177th Tunnelling Company (known for its role at Railway Wood)
- 178th Tunnelling Company
- 179th Tunnelling Company (known for creating the Lochnagar mine)
- 180th Tunnelling Company
- 181st Tunnelling Company
- 182nd Tunnelling Company
- 183rd Tunnelling Company (known for using the LLG Flame Projector in the Battle of the Somme)
- 184th Tunnelling Company
- 185th Tunnelling Company
- 250th Tunnelling Company
- 251st Tunnelling Company (known for firing the last British mine in First World War on 10 August 1917)
- 252nd Tunnelling Company (known for creating the Hawthorn Ridge mine)
- 253rd Tunnelling Company
- 254th Tunnelling Company (known as the unit of Sapper William Hackett VC)
- 255th Tunnelling Company
- 256th Tunnelling Company
- 257th Tunnelling Company
- 258th Tunnelling Company
- VIII Corps Mining Company (later merged into the 254th Tunnelling Company)
- 1st Canadian Tunnelling Company (known for creating the deep mine at St Eloi)
- 2nd Canadian Tunnelling Company
- 3rd Canadian Tunnelling Company
- New Zealand Tunnelling Company (known for its role at Carrière Wellington)
- Australian Mining Corps (split into the 4 companies below after May 1916:)
- Australian Electrical Mechanical Boring and Mining Company
- 1st Australian Tunnelling Company (portrayed in the film Beneath Hill 60)
- 2nd Australian Tunnelling Company
- 3rd Australian Tunnelling Company

== See also ==
- 1st Anzac Entrenching Battalion
- Birdsong, a 1993 novel by Sebastian Faulks, was adapted in 2012 as a two-part television drama directed by Philip Martin. The novel tells the story of an officer who fights alongside a tunneller at Messines and draws heavily on the experiences of the tunnelling companies of the Royal Engineers.
- Beneath Hill 60 a 2010 Australian war film, directed by Jeremy Sims and written by David Roach, tells the story of the 1st Australian Tunnelling Company. The screenplay is based on an account of the ordeal written by Captain Oliver Woodward, who is portrayed by Brendan Cowell.
