= 176th Tunnelling Company =

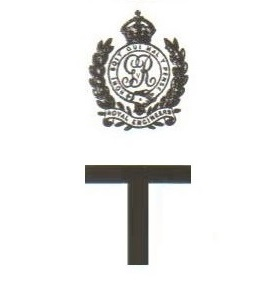
- Active: World War I
- Country: United Kingdom
- Branch: British Army
- Type: Royal Engineer tunnelling company
- Role: military engineering, tunnel warfare
- Nickname: "The Moles"
- Engagements: World War I Vimy Ridge

The 176th Tunnelling Company was one of the tunnelling companies of the Royal Engineers created by the British Army during World War I. The tunnelling units were occupied in offensive and defensive mining involving the placing and maintaining of mines under enemy lines, as well as other underground work such as the construction of deep dugouts for troop accommodation, the digging of subways, saps (a narrow trench dug to approach enemy trenches), cable trenches and underground chambers for signals and medical services.

== Background ==
By January 1915 it had become evident to the BEF at the Western Front that the Germans were mining to a planned system. As the British had failed to develop suitable counter-tactics or underground listening devices before the war, field marshals French and Kitchener agreed to investigate the suitability of forming British mining units. Following consultations between the Engineer-in-Chief of the BEF, Brigadier George Fowke, and the mining specialist John Norton-Griffiths, the War Office formally approved the tunnelling company scheme on 19 February 1915.

Norton-Griffiths ensured that tunnelling companies numbers 170 to 177 were ready for deployment in mid-February 1915. In the spring of that year, there was constant underground fighting in the Ypres Salient at Hooge, Hill 60, Railway Wood, Sanctuary Wood, St Eloi and The Bluff which required the deployment of new drafts of tunnellers for several months after the formation of the first eight companies. The lack of suitably experienced men led to some tunnelling companies starting work later than others. The number of units available to the BEF was also restricted by the need to provide effective counter-measures to the German mining activities. To make the tunnels safer and quicker to deploy, the British Army enlisted experienced coal miners, many outside their nominal recruitment policy. The first nine companies, numbers 170 to 178, were each commanded by a regular Royal Engineers officer. These companies each comprised 5 officers and 269 sappers; they were aided by additional infantrymen who were temporarily attached to the tunnellers as required, which almost doubled their numbers. The success of the first tunnelling companies formed under Norton-Griffiths' command led to mining being made a separate branch of the Engineer-in-Chief's office under Major-General S.R. Rice, and the appointment of an 'Inspector of Mines' at the GHQ Saint-Omer office of the Engineer-in-Chief. A second group of tunnelling companies were formed from Welsh miners from the 1st and 3rd Battalions of the Monmouthshire Regiment, who were attached to the 1st Northumberland Field Company of the Royal Engineers, which was a Territorial unit. The formation of twelve new tunnelling companies, between July and October 1915, helped to bring more men into action in other parts of the Western Front.

Most tunnelling companies were formed under Norton-Griffiths' leadership during 1915, and one more was added in 1916. On 10 September 1915, the British government sent an appeal to Canada, South Africa, Australia and New Zealand to raise tunnelling companies in the Dominions of the British Empire. On 17 September, New Zealand became the first Dominion to agree the formation of a tunnelling unit. The New Zealand Tunnelling Company arrived at Plymouth on 3 February 1916 and was deployed to the Western Front in northern France. A Canadian unit was formed from men on the battlefield, plus two other companies trained in Canada and then shipped to France. Three Australian tunnelling companies were formed by March 1916, resulting in 30 tunnelling companies of the Royal Engineers being available by the summer of 1916.

== Unit history ==
=== Formation ===
176th Tunnelling Company was formed at Lestrem in the Pas-de-Calais department in the Nord-Pas-de-Calais region of France in April 1915, and moved soon after to the Neuve Chapelle area, facing Bois du Biez. From its formation until the end of the war the company served under First Army.

=== Givenchy 1915 ===
In June 1915 the company was moved to Givenchy, where it relieved 170th Tunnelling Company which had been operating there since spring 1915 to counter enemy mining activity in that sector.

=== Cuinchy 1915 ===
The company was next deployed in Summer 1915 on operations under the command of 2nd Division near Cuinchy, again alongside 170th Tunnelling Company and the 173rd Tunnelling Company.

=== Givenchy 1916 ===
176th Tunnelling Company saw action in the northern Givenchy area until it was relieved by 254th Tunnelling Company, arriving from Gallipoli, in Spring 1916.

=== Vimy 1916 ===
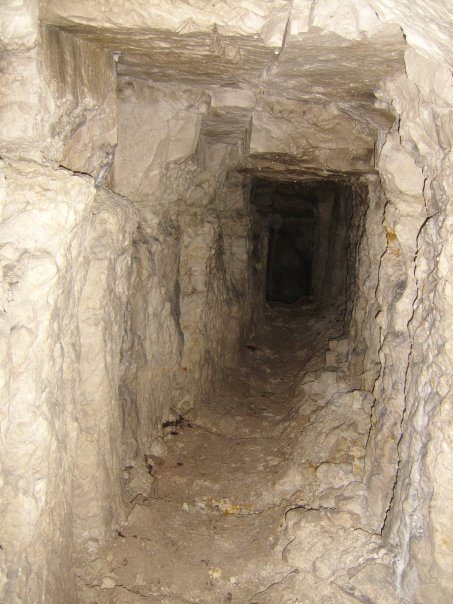
British-dug fighting tunnel in Vimy sector

In April 1916, 176th Tunnelling Company moved to Neuville-Saint-Vaast near Vimy in northern France, where it remained for a considerable time. Neuville-Saint-Vaast was close to the German "Labyrinth" stronghold between Arras and Vimy and not far from Notre Dame de Lorette. British tunnellers took over mining in this area progressively from the French between February and May 1916. From spring 1916, the British had deployed five tunnelling companies along the Vimy Ridge, and during the first two months of their tenure in the area, 70 mines were fired, mostly by the Germans. Between October 1915 and April 1917 an estimated 150 French, British and German charges were fired in this 7 kilometres (4.3 mi) sector of the Western Front.

In March 1916, the New Zealand Tunnelling Company had taken over this sector of the Western Front between Roclincourt and Écurie from the French 7/1 compagnie d'ingénieurs territoriaux. On 29 March 1916, the New Zealanders exchanged position with the 185th Tunnelling Company and moved to Roclincourt-Chantecler, a kilometre south of their old sector. At the same time, the 172nd Tunnelling Company was deployed in the Neuville-Saint-Vaast sector along with the 176th and 185th Tunnelling Companies. 172nd Tunnelling Company was relieved in this area by the 2nd Australian Tunnelling Company in May 1916. Also in May 1916, a German infantry attack, which forced the British back 640 metres (700 yd), was aimed at neutralising British mining activity by capturing the shaft entrances. From June 1916, however, the Germans withdrew many miners to work on the Hindenburg Line and also for work in coal mines in Germany. In the second half of 1916 the British constructed strong defensive underground positions, and from August 1916, the Royal Engineers developed a mining scheme to support a large-scale infantry attack on the Vimy Ridge proposed for autumn 1916, although this was subsequently postponed. After September 1916, when the Royal Engineers had completed their network of defensive galleries along most of the front line, offensive mining largely ceased although activities continued until 1917. The British gallery network beneath Vimy Ridge eventually grew to a length of 12 kilometres (7.5 mi).

The Canadian Corps was posted to the northern part of Vimy Ridge in October 1916 and preparations for an attack were revived in February 1917. Prior to the Battle of Vimy Ridge (9–12 April 1917), the British tunnelling companies secretly laid a series of explosive charges under German positions in an effort to destroy surface fortifications before the assault. The original plan had called for 17 mines and 9 Wombat charges to support the infantry attack, of which 13 (possibly 14) mines and 8 Wombat charges were eventually laid. At the same time, 19 crater groups existed along this section of the Western Front, each with several large craters. In order to assess the consequences of infantry having to advance across cratered ground after a mining attack, officers from the Canadian Corps visited La Boisselle and Fricourt where the mines on the first day of the Somme had been blown. Their reports and the experience of the Canadians at St Eloi in April 1916 – where mines had so altered and damaged the landscape as to render occupation of the mine craters by the infantry all but impossible –, led to the decision to remove offensive mining from the central sector allocated to the Canadian Corps at Vimy Ridge. Further British mines in the area were vetoed following the blowing by the Germans on 23 March 1917 of nine craters along no man's land as it was probable that the Germans were aiming to restrict an Allied attack to predictable points. The three mines already laid by 172nd Tunnelling Company were also dropped from the British plans. They were left in place after the assault and were only removed in the 1990s. Another mine, prepared by 176th Tunnelling Company against the German strongpoint known as the Pimple, was not completed in time for the attack. The gallery had been pushed silently through the clay, avoiding the sandy and chalky layers of the Vimy Ridge, but by 9 April 1917 was still 21 metres (70 ft) short of its target. In the end, two mines were blown before the attack, while three mines and two Wombat charges were fired to support the attack, including those forming a northern flank.

Other units active around Vimy were 175th, 182nd, 184th and 255th Tunnelling Companies.

== See also ==
- Mine warfare

== Bibliography ==
- Jones, Simon (2010). Underground Warfare 1914-1918. Pen & Sword Military. ISBN 978-1-84415-962-8.
