= Givenchy-en-Gohelle =

- Commune
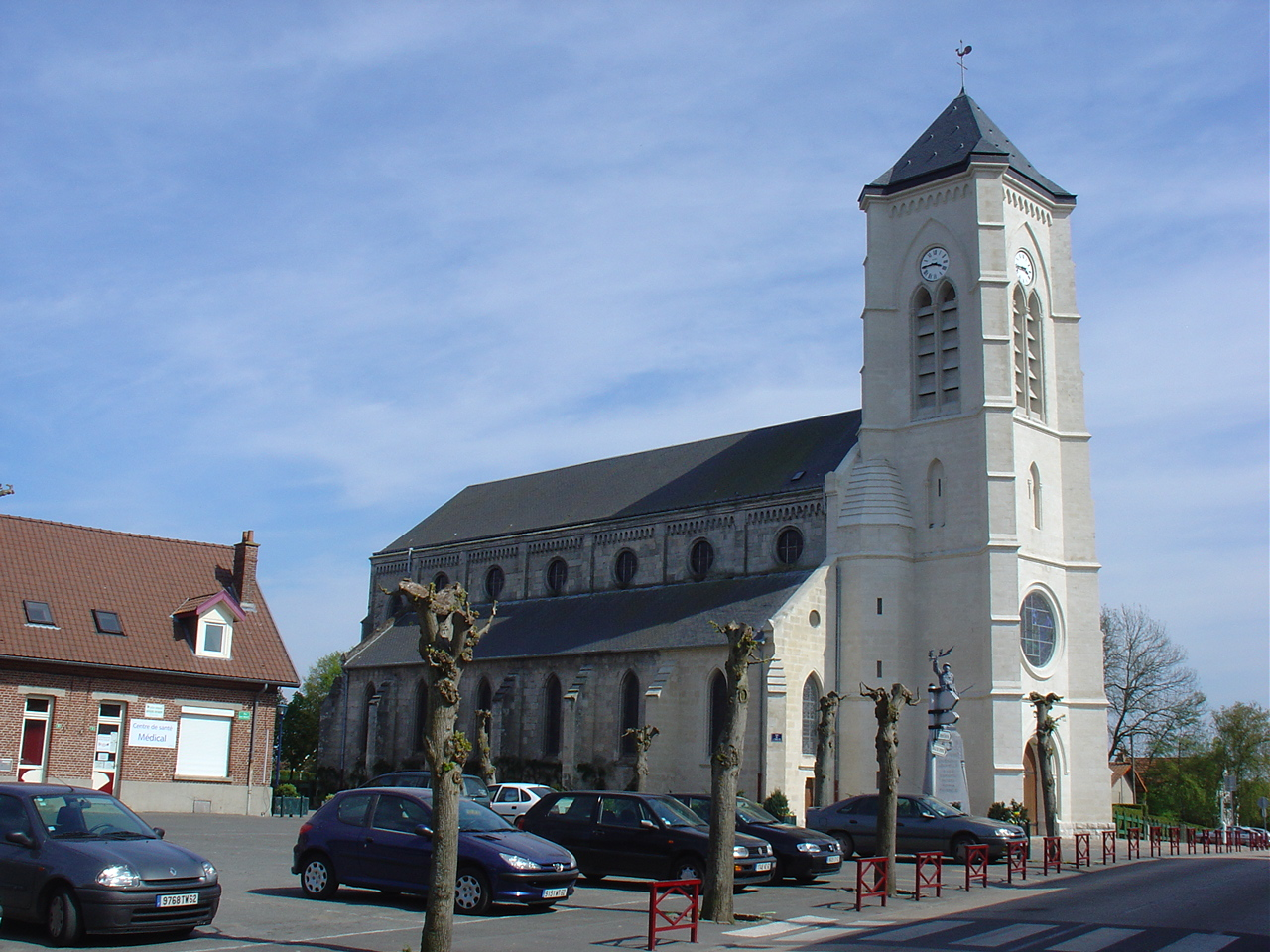
- 17th century Église Saint-Martin

- Coat of arms
- Location of Givenchy-en-Gohelle
- Location within France Location within Hauts-de-France
- Coordinates: 50°23′37″N 2°46′23″E
- Country: France
- Region: Hauts-de-France
- Department: Pas-de-Calais
- Arrondissement: Lens
- Canton: Liévin
- Intercommunality: CA Lens-Liévin

Government
  - Mayor (2020–2026): Pierre Senechal
- Area^{1}: 5.95 km^{2} (2.30 sq mi)
- Elevation: 97 m (318 ft)
- Highest elevation: 148 m (486 ft)
- Lowest elevation: 48 m (157 ft)
- Population (2023): 2,072
  - Density: 348/km^{2} (902/sq mi)
- Time zone: UTC+01:00 (CET)
  - Summer (DST): UTC+02:00 (CEST)
- INSEE/Postal code: 62371 /62580
- ^{1} French Land Register data, which excludes lakes, ponds, glaciers > 1 km^{2} (0.386 sq mi or 247 acres) and river estuaries.

Givenchy-en-Gohelle (French pronunciation: [ʒivɑ̃ʃi ɑ̃ ɡɔɛl], lit. 'Givenchy in Gohelle'; Picard: Givinchy-in-Gohelle) is a commune in the Pas-de-Calais department in the Hauts-de-France region of France. The village was destroyed during World War I but was rebuilt after the war.

== Geography ==
Givenchy-en-Gohelle is a large farming village situated 6 miles (9.7 km) north of Arras, at the junction of the D51 and the D55 roads. Its neighboring communes are Souchez to the west, Angres to the northwest, Liévin to the north, Avion to the east and Vimy to the southeast.

The Bois de Givenchy or Givenchy Forest, covers much of the commune on its northern side. To further the agricultural range of products, the commune of Givenchy-en-Gohelle have planted grapes (chardonnay and pinot gris). The first grape harvest took place in 2000.

== First World War ==
During the First World War, Givenchy-en-Gohelle was on the front line between German and Allied forces during the battles of Arras and was severely damaged, particularly during the Battle of Vimy Ridge in 1917. For much of the First World War, the village also was the site of sustained underground fighting between German and British tunneling units. Givenchy-en-Gohelle was taken by the 2nd Canadian Division on 13 April 1917. Over 150 war casualties (1914–1918) are commemorated at the Canadian cemetery here and 109 from the Battle of Vimy Ridge are buried here.

The centennial commemoration of the Battle of Vimy Ridge was held at the Canadian National Vimy Memorial near the village on 9 April 2017. Estimates before the event indicated that up to 30,000 would attend.

By early April 2017, the village had been decorated with 500 Canadian flags.

== Population ==
Historical population
| Year | Pop. | ±% p.a. |
|---|---|---|
| 1968 | 1,555 | — |
| 1975 | 1,627 | +0.65% |
| 1982 | 1,755 | +1.09% |
| 1990 | 1,973 | +1.47% |
| 1999 | 2,051 | +0.43% |
| 2007 | 2,093 | +0.25% |
| 2012 | 2,024 | −0.67% |
| 2017 | 1,947 | −0.77% |
| 2023 | 2,072 | +1.04% |
Source: INSEE

== Places of interest ==
- The Canadian National Vimy Memorial to commemorate First World War Canadian dead and missing, presumed dead, in France.
- The church of St. Martin, dating from the seventeenth century.
- The Commonwealth War Graves Commission Canadian memorial and cemeteries.

== See also ==
- Communes of the Pas-de-Calais department

== Gallery ==
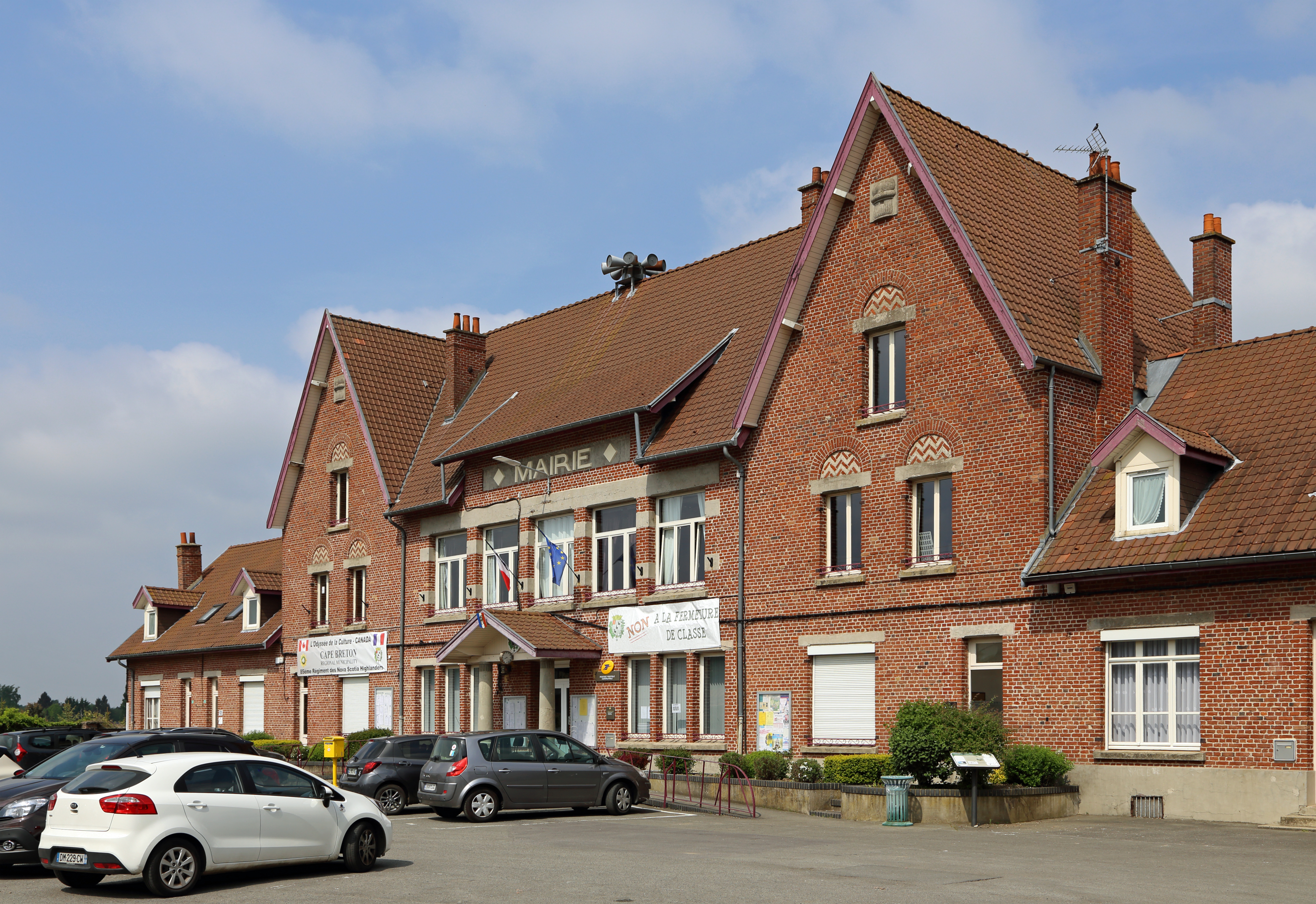
Town hall

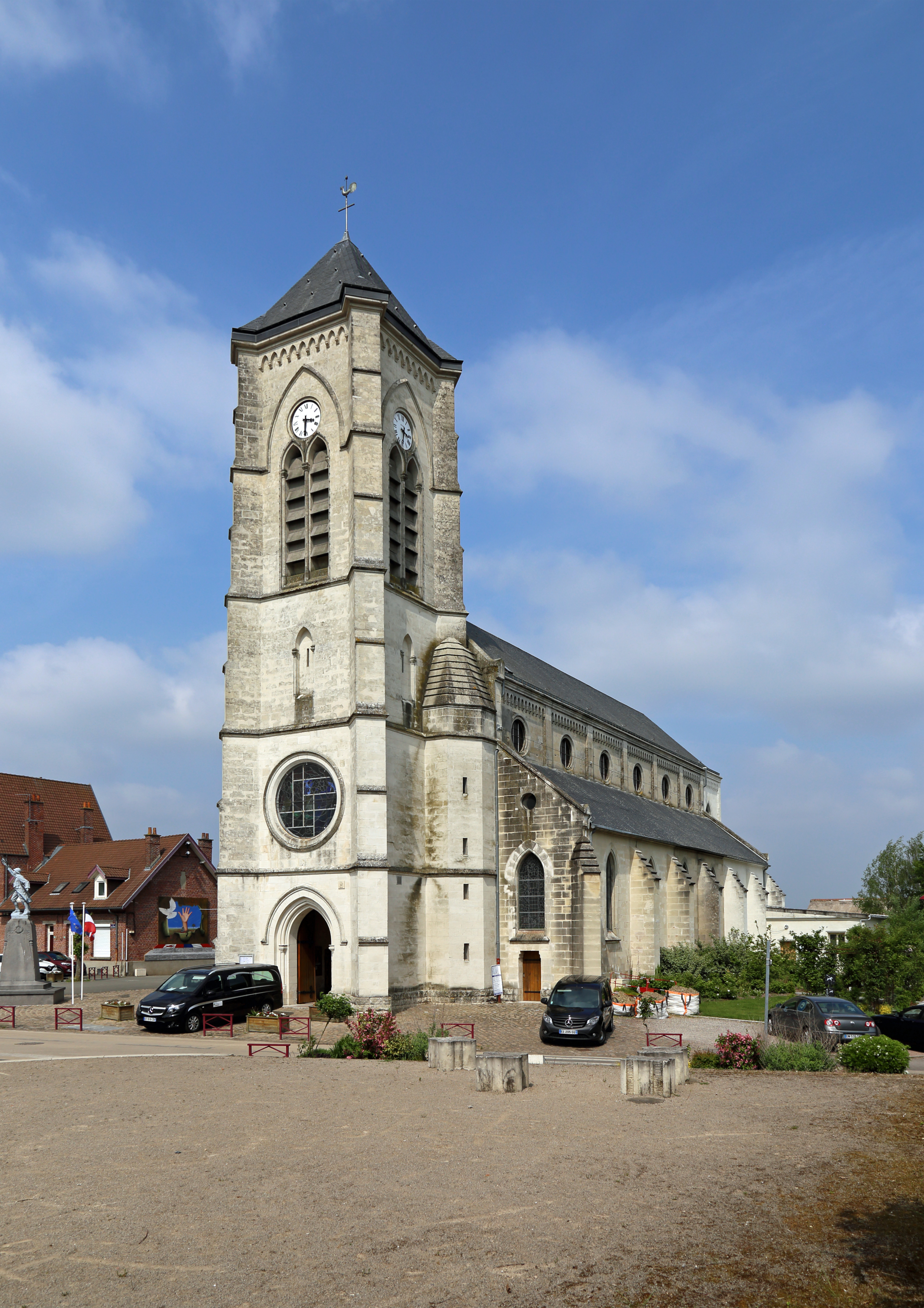
Saint-Martin church

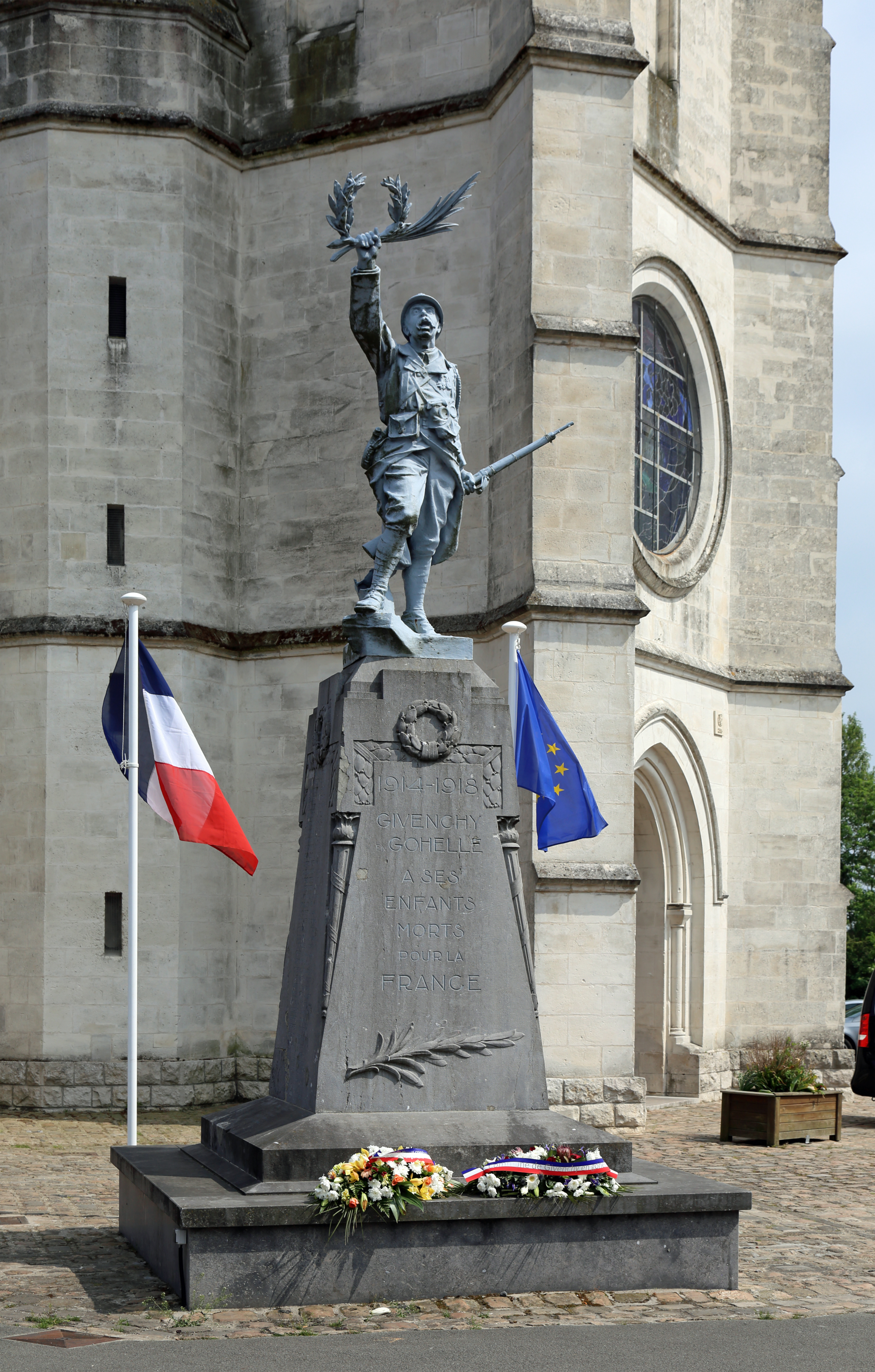
War memorial
