= Edwin Alderson =

British and Canadian First World War general

Lieutenant-General Sir Edwin Alderson KCB
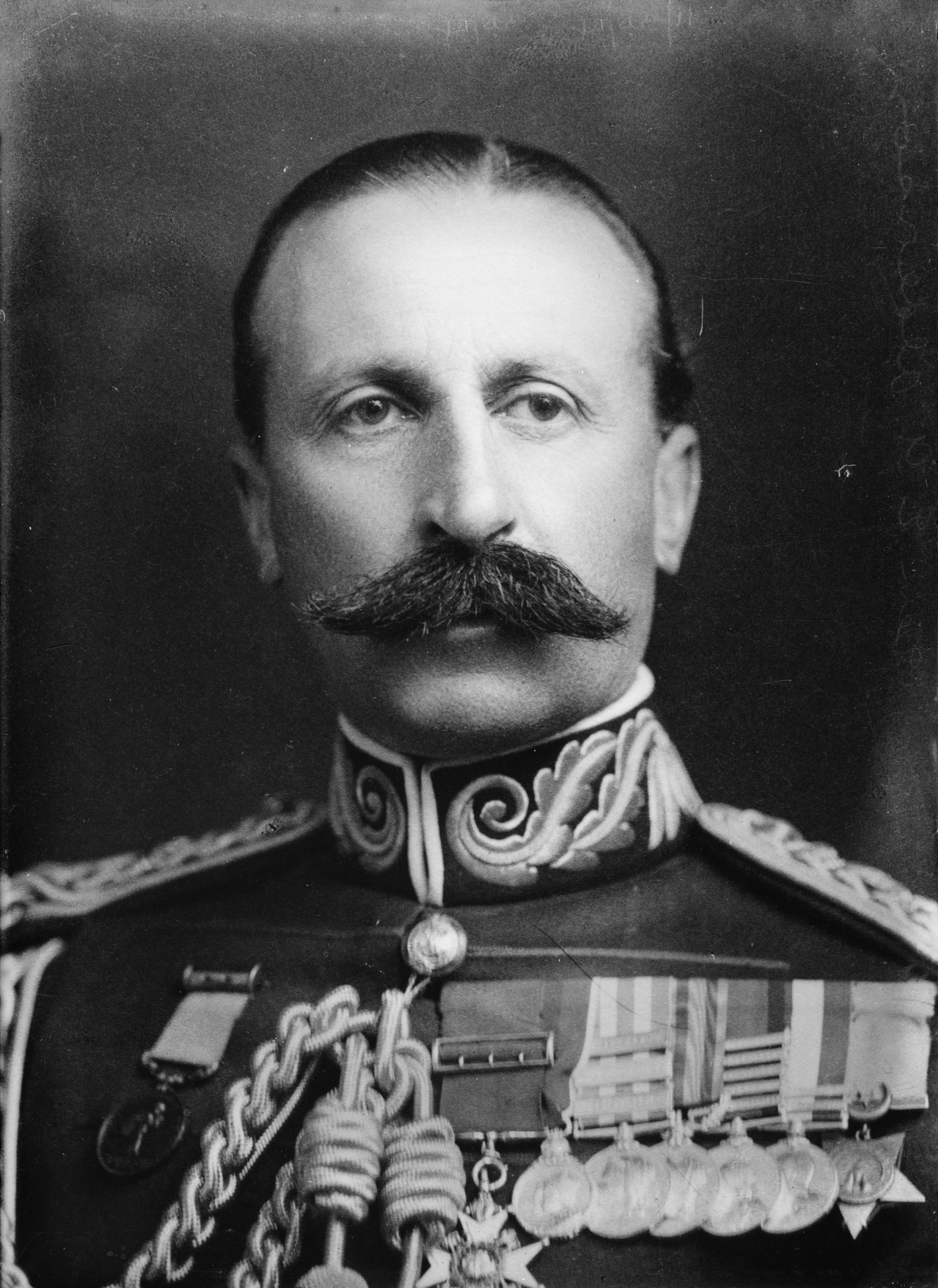
- Lieutenant General Alderson, c. 1910
- Born: 8 April 1859; Capel St Mary, Suffolk, England
- Died: 14 December 1927 (aged 68); Lowestoft, Suffolk, England
- Military career
- Allegiance: United Kingdom
- Branch: British Army
- Service years: 1878–1920
- Rank: Lieutenant General
- Unit: Queen's Own Royal West Kent Regiment
- Commands: Canadian Corps; 1st Canadian Division
- Conflicts: First Boer War; Anglo-Egyptian War: Battle of Tel-el-Kebir; Mahdist War; Second Matabele War; Second Boer War: Battle of Paardeberg; Siege of Kimberley; Battle of Driefontein; Battle of Witpoort; First World War: Battle of Neuve Chapelle; Second battle of Ypres; Battle of Festubert; Second Battle of Givenchy; Battle of St-Eloi
- Awards: Knight Commander of the Order of the Bath; Mentioned in Despatches; Legion of Honour (France)

Lieutenant-General Sir Edwin Alfred Hervey Alderson, KCB (8 April 1859 – 14 December 1927) was a senior British Army officer who served in several campaigns of the late nineteenth and early twentieth centuries. From 1915 to 1916 during the First World War he commanded the Canadian Expeditionary Force on the Western Front, during which time it saw heavy fighting.

== Early life ==
Born in 1859 in Capel St Mary, a village in Suffolk, Edwin Alderson was the son of Lieutenant-Colonel Edward Mott Alderson and his wife Catherine Harriett Swainson. He was educated at Ipswich School.

== Early military career ==
Aged 17, Alderson received a commission into the Norfolk Artillery Militia, and at 19 he was transferred to the 1st Foot (later Royal Scots Regiment) on 4 December 1878. He transferred again ten days later, replacing a promoted officer, to his father's regiment, the 97th (The Earl of Ulster's) Regiment of Foot (soon to become a battalion of the Queen's Own Royal West Kent Regiment). Joining the regiment in Halifax, Nova Scotia, Alderson was soon transferred to Gibraltar and later South Africa, where he was detached to the Mounted Infantry Depot at Laing's Nek.

=== Mounted Infantry ===
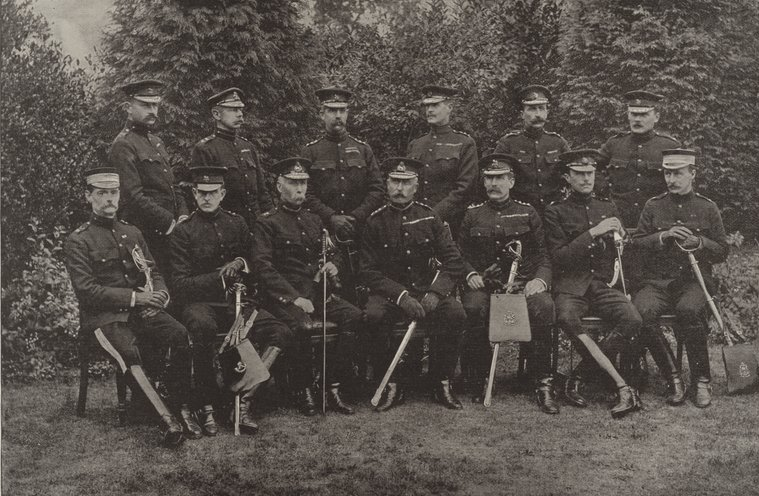
The retirement of the Duke of Connaught from the Aldershot Command, 1898. Stood in the back row, second on the right, is Lieutenant Colonel Alderson.

The Mounted Infantry Depot was a post where young officers could be stationed, forming a ready reserve of young, educated officers available as volunteers for staff or command positions in African colonial campaigns. It was whilst attached to this post that Alderson saw service in the First Boer War in 1881 in the Transvaal. The following year, Alderson served in the 1882 Anglo-Egyptian War, fighting at the battles of Kassassin and Tel-el-Kebir. Two years later, he was attached to the Mounted Camel Regiment during the failed expedition to relieve Khartoum and rescue General Gordon. During this campaign, Alderson was presented with the Bronze Medal of the Royal Humane Society after diving into the Nile to rescue a drowning soldier. For his service in these campaigns, Alderson was promoted to captain, upon being transferred to the Queen's Own (Royal West Kent Regiment) in June 1886, and was stationed at Aldershot with the European Mounted Infantry Depot. The same year he married the daughter of the vicar of Syresham, Northamptonshire, a Miss Alice Mary Sergeant. The couple had one son.

The next ten years of Alderson's career were spent on staff duties and with his old regiment in England and Ireland. He also undertook training at the Staff College, Camberley, from 1895 to 1896. and in 1896 was sent to Mashonaland as a commander of a regiment of local troops during the Second Matabele War. Following the campaign's successful conclusion he returned to Aldershot to serve as a deputy assistant adjutant general, taking over from Frederick Stopford. While there, he published his first book, With the Mounted Infantry and the Mashonaland Field Force, 1896, an account of the war and a thesis on the tactical uses of mounted infantry. A second book on military tactics followed in 1898 called The Counter-attack. His third book, "Pink and scarlet" was published in 1900 and was another tactical treatise concerning the relationship between fox-hunting and the cavalry, and the connection that these gentlemanly and military concerns had in training young officers and developing innovations in cavalry tactics.

=== Second Boer War ===
In late 1899, shortly after the Second Boer War started, Alderson returned to South Africa to command a Corps of Mounted Infantry against the Afrikaner forces. His experience with mounted infantry made him suitable for this role in fighting the highly mobile horsed Boer Commandos, as they moved in the latter part of the conflict to a strategy of hit and run attacks upon the British Expeditionary Force in South Africa. Alderson was instrumental in forming British counter-tactics and used his brigade to good effect against the Afrikaners, the troops under his command including two battalions of Canadian Mounted Rifles. The force was part of the 1st Mounted Infantry Brigade, under the overall command of experienced British soldier Edward Hutton, previously General-Officer-Commanding the Canadian Militia, who became a lifelong friend of Alderson's. Among the Canadian troopers Alderson was a popular commander, being preferred to the tactless Hutton by the Commander of the 2nd Canadian Mounted Rifles, and in 1901 the then Governor General of Canada, Lord Minto, unsuccessfully petitioned the British government to have Alderson brought to Canada as G.O.C. of its Militia.

He participated in the battles of Paardeberg and Driefontein as well as the relief of Kimberley and the capture of Bloemfontein and Pretoria. The result of Alderson's contribution in these campaigns was to be appointed in command of the 2nd Mounted Infantry Brigade with rank as a brigadier general in October 1900, appointment as a Companion of the Order of the Bath (CB) and to receive the ceremonial post of Aide-de-Camp to Queen Victoria (who died the same year). By 1901, Alderson's innovations had resulted in several victorious operations, and in July that year he was appointed Inspector General of Mounted infantry in the Natal District.

He was mentioned in despatches several times (including by Lord Roberts dated 31 March 1900, and by Lord Kitchener dated 23 June 1902), and received the Queen's South Africa Medal. After the end of the war in June 1902, Alderson stayed in South Africa another couple of months as Inspector General of Mounted Infantry, returning home on the SS Scot in November.

=== 1902–1914 ===
On his return, Alderson was attached to the 1st Army Corps, stationed at Aldershot. In May 1903 he was given command of the 2nd Infantry Brigade which was part of the 1st Division in the 1st Army Corps at Aldershot, and in December 1906 was promoted to the rank of major general. In 1908, he released a compilation of notes made on campaign entitled Lessons from 100 notes made in peace and war. The same year he was posted to India to command the 6th (Poona) Division based in Poona.

In 1912 he returned to England in semi-retirement on half-pay, later becoming a master of foxhounds in the South Shropshire Hunt, and developing an enthusiasm for yachting.

== First World War ==
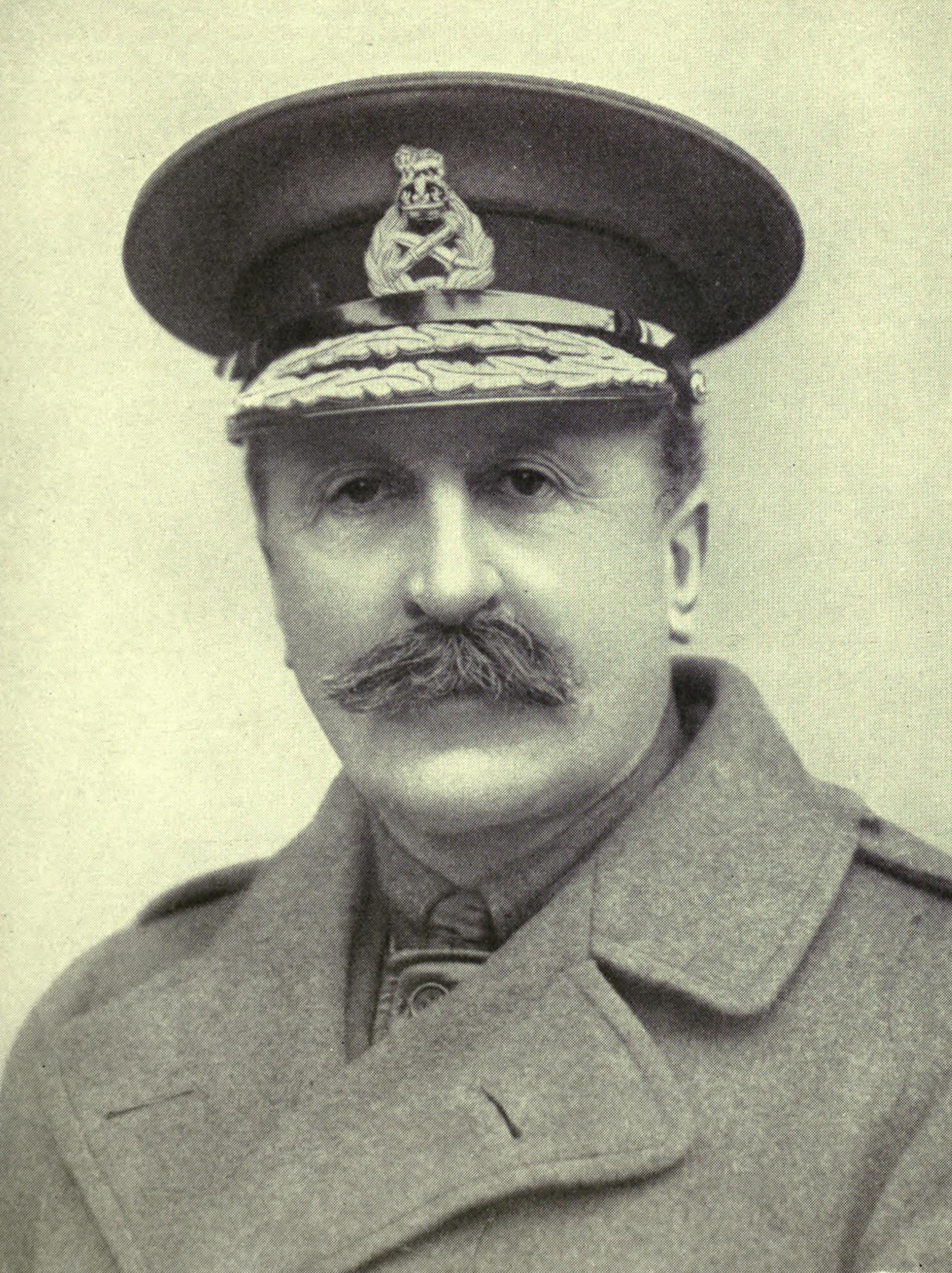
Photo of Alderson, c. 1915

At the outbreak of the First World War in the summer of 1914, Alderson was, on 5 August, placed in charge of the 1st Mounted Division and all troops in the counties of Norfolk and Suffolk. However he was given larger duties when he was appointed by Field Marshal Lord Kitchener to lead the Canadian Expeditionary Force because of his experience with the Canadians in South Africa. Soon after his appointment he came into conflict with Sir Sam Hughes, Canadian Minister of Militia. Hughes had preceded his men and insisted that the Canadian contingent was not only fully trained and battle ready but also equipped with the best weaponry available. Alderson however, after reviewing the Canadian formation was concerned about its combat readiness, particularly regarding some of its commissioned officers, who appeared to owe their positions to political connections rather than through professional military qualifications, the degree of training of the troops had received, and the mechanically temperamental Ross rifle, a weapon personally approved by Hughes.

During training on Salisbury Plain, Alderson, promoted to lieutenant general in October, made some headway in toughening the Canadian troops encamped in the wet, autumn weather, and dismissed some commissioned officers, appointed at Hughes' discretion, whom he thought incompetent. When Hughes' representative in England, Colonel John Wallace Carson, secured preferential accommodation for the Canadian soldiers at the expense of a British Army brigade, Alderson refused the barracks and in doing so, drew personal hostility from both Carson and Hughes upon himself. Carson wrote to the Canadian Prime Minister Robert Laird Borden that Alderson "does not treat our men with a firm iron hand covered with the velvet glove which their special temperaments require".

=== Second Battle of Ypres ===
The Canadian Division sailed from England and landed in France in February 1915, and was briefly initiated to trench warfare on the periphery of the Battle of Neuve Chapelle in March 1915, before being attached to the British 2nd Army, under the command of Sir Horace Smith-Dorrien, in the Belgian town of Ypres. It was in front of Ypres on 22 April 1915 that the Canadians bore the brunt of the opening by the Imperial German Army of the 2nd Battle of Ypres, presaged by the first use in history of poison gas as a military weapon. At 5.00 pm the Germans began heavily shelling the French trenches adjoining the Canadian Division's sector, and the Canadians and the French Algerian troops stationed next to them saw a fog traveling across no-mans land towards their positions, which also concealed the advance of German forces behind it wearing gas masks. The fog was chlorine gas. The Algerians broke and fled, suffering over 6,000 casualties in a matter of minutes, and the Canadians were consequently forced to defend twice the length of the front line they had vacated. Although the Canadian Division held on for more than two days, ground was lost to the attacking Germans, and the Canadian Division suffered over 50% casualties (nearly 6,000 troops).

For Alderson the battle had been a failure. Although his troops had held the line, he had found himself out of touch with the action at times during its course, and unable to get accurate information about the situation. At one stage he had been commanding 33 battalions across several miles of front line with no central co-ordination and great confusion between his distant headquarters and the trenches. In addition the Ross rifles had proved almost useless in battle, and some of Canadian officers had performed poorly in their first battle. In particular Brigadier-General Richard Turner, commander of the 3rd Brigade, and Turner's brigade-major, Colonel Garnet Hughes, the son of Sam Hughes, caused havoc when on the second day of the battle they unilaterally withdrew the 3rd Brigade from the front line in the process opening up a 4,000-yard gap in the British front, through which the Germans briefly threatened the defence of the Ypres Salient as a whole. Colonel Carson however, who reported personally to Hughes, downplayed the mishaps, and blamed the Division's heavy casualties on Alderson's leadership, indicating that it had only been saved from annihilation by the actions of Turner and Hughes.

=== Ross rifle controversy ===
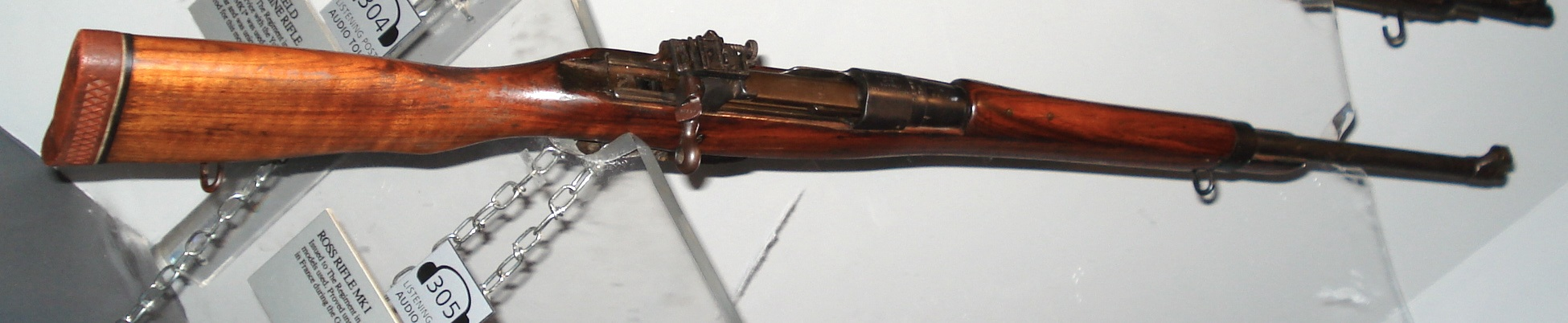
The controversial Ross rifle

The Canadian situation worsened at the Battle of Festubert in May 1915, when it failed to make any headway against the Germans despite suffering nearly 2,500 casualties. Another operation a month later, the Second Battle of Givenchy, cost 366 casualties for no appreciable gain. Despite this, Alderson was promoted to command the entire expeditionary force on the Western Front, now titled the Canadian Corps, when a second division of it arrived at the front late in 1915. However Sam Hughes increasingly opposed Alderson's position in Canadian political circles, taking particular offense at Alderson's refusal to accept promotions made by Hughes or Carson of untried Canadian officers, and instead promoting veteran British officers in their place, and Alderson's opposition to the continued use by the Canadian divisions of the Ross rifle.

By early 1916 it had become clear to the troops using it that the mechanism of the Ross rifle was useless, and in some circumstances dangerous to soldiers using it in the conditions of the trenches, and its incompatibility with the British Lee–Enfield rifle meant that the Canadian troops were continually running out of ammunition. Hughes however had invested great political capital in the weapon and refused to countenance a switch to the .303 calibre Lee-Enfield. The matter reached a head when Alderson, newly knighted as a Knight Commander of the Order of the Bath (KCB), circulated a document listing ten deficiencies with the rifle and claiming 85% of Canadian soldiers no longer wished to use it. Hughes in response sent letters to 281 senior military figures backing the Ross, and attacking Alderson's character. Alderson responded by ordering all subordinate commanders to prepare reports on the efficiency of the Ross in the field. Carson, on its receipt, sent a copy of this order back to Hughes, along with a note from Turner stating that "action is being delayed too long as regards Alderson".

=== Battle of St. Eloi craters ===
Turner had his own reasons for wanting Alderson removed from the post of commanding the Canadian Expeditionary Force following the Actions of St Eloi Craters in March–April 1916. After British troops had taken a large crater near the ruins of the Belgian town of St Eloi, a brigade of Turner's division was ordered to hold the gain against German counter-attacks. Due to mishandling of the Canadian forces by Turner and Brigadier-General Huntly Ketchen, German units succeeded in overrunning the crater, causing 1,400 Canadian casualties in the process and recapturing trenches around the crater, negating the gains made at heavy cost just a few days before. Sir Herbert Plumer, the commander of British 2nd Army commanding the front, demanded Ketchen's immediate dismissal, and when Turner claimed that if Ketchen was dismissed he would resign, Alderson sought his dismissal as well. Both officers were supporters of Sam Hughes, who made it clear in no uncertain terms to the British Expeditionary Force's Commander-in-Chief, General Sir Douglas Haig, that if Turner was dismissed then the British Government could no longer rely on Canadian support.

Haig's solution to this diplomatic crisis was a compromise. Alderson, whom Haig had lost confidence in for the defeat at the St. Eloi craters action, was appointed to a nominal newly created post of "Inspector-General of Canadian Forces", and Sir Julian Byng was appointed in his place in command of the Canadian Corps, supported by Sir Arthur Currie, who had succeeded Alderson to the command of the 1st Canadian Division. In exchange, Haig finally got rid of the Ross rifle, all Canadian troops being issued with Lee–Enfields in preparation for the upcoming Battle of the Somme.

Alderson was not initially aware of the purely nominal nature of his new position, and with it the practical end of his field career, and when he requested a staff car for its duties he was informed that the post did not require one to be issued. In September 1916 he was withdrawn from the attachment to the Canadian Expeditionary Force and appointed to the War Office post of inspector of infantry, which he retained until April 1920 when he retired from active service at the age of 61 years.

== Last years ==
Alderson enjoyed an active retirement, becoming colonel of the Queen's Own Royal West Kent Regiment in November 1921, pursuing hunting and yachting with fervour, being an active master of foxhounds of the South Shropshire Hunt and member of the Royal Norfolk and Suffolk Yacht Club. He was also very concerned that the growing popularity of motor sports would result in the demise of these traditional pastimes and expended much energy promoting them. He lived in his final years on a houseboat moored in Oulton Broad.

== Death ==
Alderson died on 14 December 1927 at the Royal Hotel, Lowestoft of a sudden heart attack at the age of 68 years. His body was buried at Chesterton, Oxfordshire. He was survived by his wife who arranged for his private papers to be given to the nation. They are currently stored at British Library, and at the National Archives of Zimbabwe.

== Reputation ==
Alderson retained strong feelings about his treatment at the hands of Hughes and his allies, commenting to a friend that "Canadian politics have been too strong for all of us". Nonetheless, he was well liked by the men he commanded and was remembered in The Times on his death as "An Englishman of a fine type" and that "the affection which he inspired in all who knew him was great". The Dictionary of Canadian Biography recalls him as "A decent, honourable, unimaginative man, [who] had been more faithful to the interests of Canadian soldiers than their own minister".

Another biographer, Tabitha Marshall, wrote (2014) that the conflict between Hughes and Alderson "likely affected not only his career but also his place in Canadian history. While his successors as Canadian Corps Commander, Byng and Currie, are well remembered, Alderson is relatively unknown to Canadians."

English military historian Alan Clark's book "The Donkeys" (1961), a polemical indictment of British General Staff incompetence in 1915 Western Front operations, contains a photograph of Alderson decorating a Canadian soldier with a medal, captioned "Donkey Decorates Lion", stating he was decorating the unnamed soldier for bravery at the Second Battle of Ypres (1915). In fact, the photograph was taken the following year, on 9 March 1916 "near Locre" (Loker), Belgium.

== Namesake ==
The name Mount Alderson was given in 1915 to one of the peaks in the Waterton Lakes National Park in Alberta, Canada.

== Works ==
- With the Mounted Infantry and the Mashonaland Field Force, 1896 (1898)
- The Counter-attack (1898)
- Pink and Scarlet or Hunting as a School for Soldiering (1900)
- Lessons from 100 Notes Made in Peace and War (1908)

== Notes ==
Military offices
Preceded by New post	GOC Canadian Corps; 1915–1916	Succeeded by Sir Julian Byng
