= Infanterie-Regiment Nr. 213 =

Military unit

Reserve-Infanterie-Regiment Nr. 213 was a reserve infantry regiment in the German Imperial Army, organized shortly after mobilization in August 1914. It was assigned to the 91st Reserve-Infanterie-Brigade of the 46. Reserve-Division until September 1916, when it was transferred to the 89th Reserve-Infanterie-Brigade of the 207th Infanterie-Division.

== See also ==
- List of Imperial German infantry regiments
