= St. Eloi Mountain =

Mountain in Western Canada

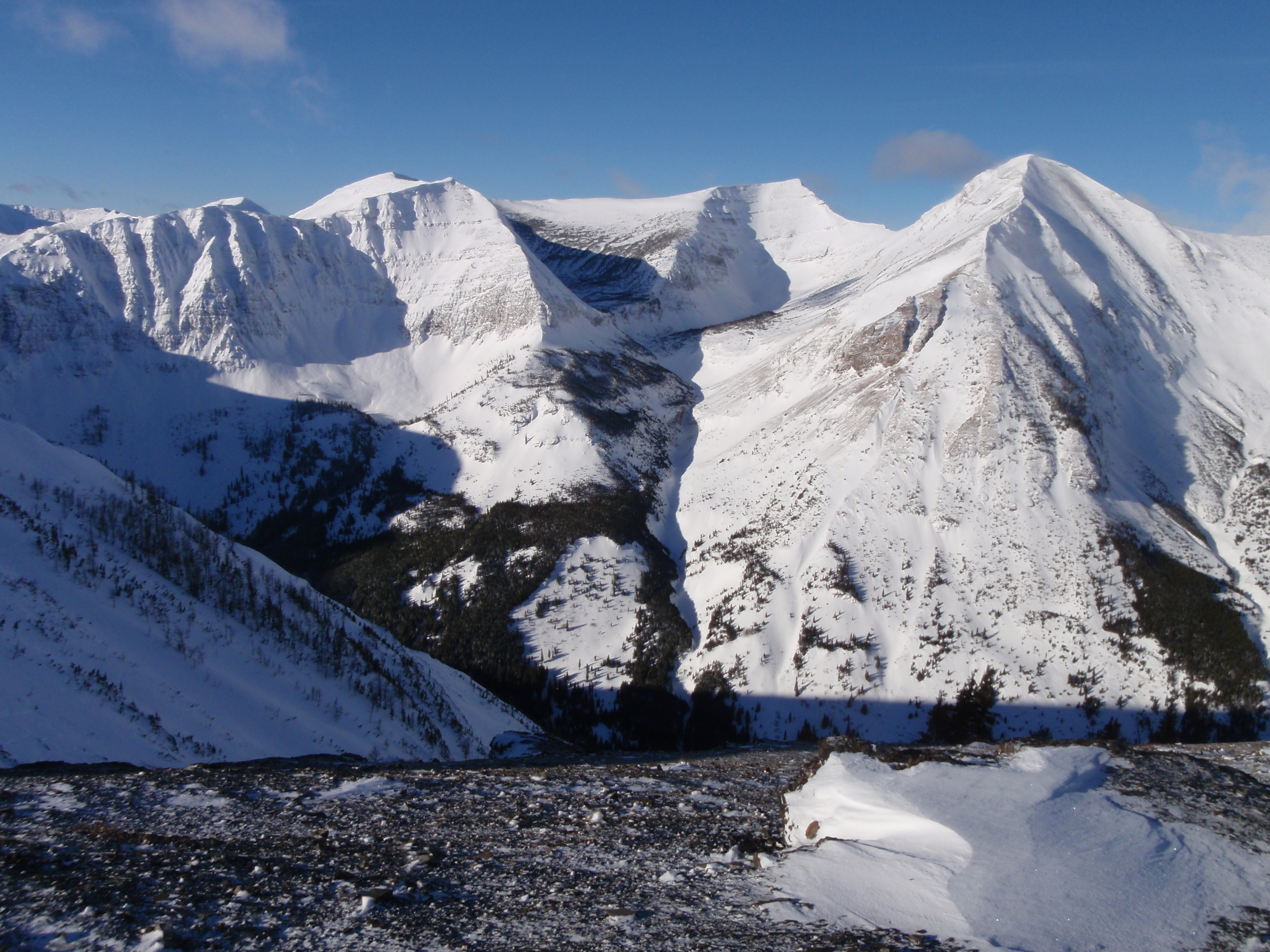
- East aspect

Highest point
- Elevation: 2,499 m (8,199 ft)
- Prominence: 319 m (1,047 ft)
- Coordinates: 49°19′36″N 114°28′42″W

Geography
- Location within Alberta Location within British Columbia Location within Canada
- Location: Alberta; British Columbia
- Parent range: Canadian Rockies
- Topo map: NTS 82G8 Beaver Mines

St. Eloi Mountain is located on the border of Alberta and British Columbia on the Continental Divide. It was named in 1917 after St. Eloi (Ypres).

== Geology ==
St. Eloi Mountain is composed of sedimentary rock laid down during the Precambrian to Jurassic periods. Formed in shallow seas, this sedimentary rock was pushed east and over the top of younger Cretaceous period rock during the Laramide orogeny.

== Climate ==
Based on the Köppen climate classification, St. Eloi Mountain is located in a subarctic climate zone with cold, snowy winters, and mild summers. Winter temperatures can drop below −20 °C with wind chill factors below −30 °C.

== See also ==
- List of peaks on the Alberta–British Columbia border
- Mountains of Alberta
- Mountains of British Columbia
