= Sint-Elooi =

Village in West Flanders, Belgium

Coordinates: 50.810°N 2.892°E

Sint-Elooi is a small village, about 5 km (3.1 mi) south of Ypres in the Flemish province of West Flanders in Belgium. The former municipality is now part of Ypres. Though Sint-Elooi is the Dutch and only official name, the village's French name, Saint-Éloi, is most commonly used in English due to its role in World War I. The village and the nearby locations of Voormezele and Hollebeke were merged into Zillebeke in 1970 and into Ypres in 1976.

== Name ==
The village takes its name from Saint Eligius (also Eloy or Loye, French: Éloi, c. 588–660 who worked for twenty years to convert the pagan population of Flanders to Christianity.

== History ==
=== World War I ===
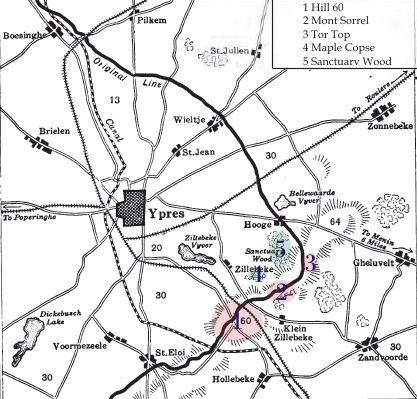
Map showing Sint-Elooi/St Eloi south of Ypres and the front line in the Ypres Salient of June 1916.

In World War I, like other parts of the Ypres Salient, the village was the site of the Battles of Ypres between German and Allied forces. From the spring of 1915, there was constant underground fighting in the Ypres Salient at Hooge, Hill 60, Railway Wood, Sanctuary Wood, The Bluff and St Eloi. The Germans built an extensive system of defensive tunnels and were actively mining against the British trenches at the intermediate levels.

In March 1915, they fired mines under the elevated area known as The Mound just south-east of St Eloi and in the ensuing fighting (the Action of St Eloi, 14–15 March 1915), in which units of the British 27th Division participated, the British infantry suffered some 500 casualties. A month later, on 14 April 1915, the Germans fired another mine producing a crater over 20 m (66 ft) in diameter. Counter-mining by the tunnelling companies of the Royal Engineers began at St Eloi in spring 1915. Much of the mining in this sector was done by the 177th Tunnelling Company and the 172nd Tunnelling Company. The geology of the Ypres Salient featured a characteristic layer of sandy clay, which put very heavy pressures of water and wet sand on the underground works and made deep mining extremely difficult.

In autumn of 1915, 172nd Tunnelling Company managed to sink shafts through the sandy clay at a depth of 7.0 metres (23 ft) down to dry blue clay at a depth of 13 metres (43 ft), which was ideal for tunneling, from where they continued to drive galleries towards the German lines at a depth of 18 metres (60 ft). This constituted a major achievement in mining technique and gave the Royal Engineers a significant advantage over their German counterparts. After German successes at The Bluff, the British decided to use the deep mines created by 172nd Tunnelling Company at St Eloi in a local operation (the Actions of St Eloi Craters, 27 March – 16 April 1916) and six charges were fired. However, the accompanying British infantry operation was a failure; the problem lay in the Allied inability to hold crater positions after they had been captured. The Canadian HMCS St. Eloi was later named after the battle.

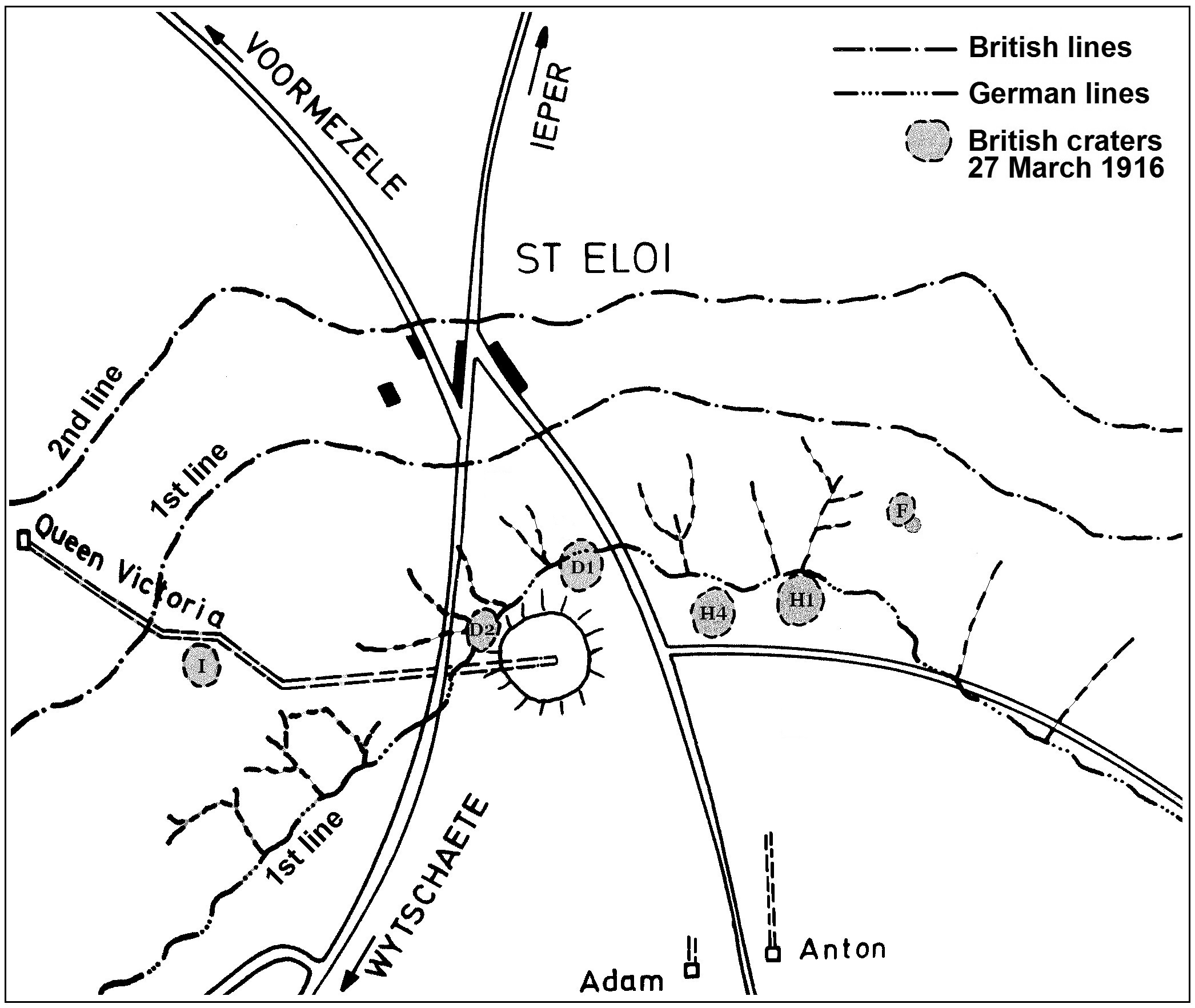
Map of St Eloi with craters of the six mines fired on 27 March 1916 and plan of the deep mine fired on 7 June 1917 as part of the mines in the Battle of Messines.

After the Actions of St Eloi Craters, mining and counter-mining at St Eloi continued at a pace. In preparation of the Battle of Messines in 1917, the British began a mining offensive against the German lines to the south of Ypres. Twenty-six deep mines were eventually dug by Tunnelling companies of the Royal Engineers, most of which were detonated simultaneously on 7 June 1917, creating 19 large craters. The largest of these mines was at St Eloi, dug by the 1st Canadian Tunnelling Company. The work was begun with a deep shaft named Queen Victoria and the chamber was set 42 metres (138 ft) below ground, at the end of a gallery 408 metres (1,339 ft) long and charged with 43,400 kilograms (95,600 lb) of ammonal. Building preparations had started on 16 August 1915 and the mine was completed on 11 June 1916.

When the large St Eloi deep mine was fired by the 1st Canadian Tunnelling Company on 7 June 1917, it destroyed some of the earlier craters from 1916 (D2 and D1), although a double crater (H4 and H1) can still be seen. The successful detonation allowed the capture of the German lines at St Eloi by the British 41st Division.

=== World War II ===
The area was fought over again during the Second World War. On 27 May 1940, the 17th Brigade of the British 5th Infantry Division stopped the advance of three German divisions at Hill 60, which enabled the British to make a general withdrawal towards St. Eloi, Kemmel and Dikkebus.

== Memorials ==
On a small square in the centre of Sint-Elooi stands the 'Monument to the St Eloi Tunnellers' which was unveiled on 11 November 2001. The brick plinth bears transparent plaques with details of the mining activities by 172nd Tunnelling Company and an extract from the poem Trenches: St Eloi by the war poet T. E. Hulme (1883–1917). There is a flagpole with the British flag next to it, and in 2003 an artillery gun was added to the memorial.

== Popular culture ==
- During World War I, David Bomberg painted Sappers at Work: A Canadian Tunnelling Company, Hill 60, St Eloi, which bears a reference to both St Eloi/Sint-Elooi and the 1st Canadian Tunnelling Company.
- The war poet T. E. Hulme (1883–1917) wrote the poem Trenches: St Eloi (online).
- The story "Herbert West–Reanimator" by H. P. Lovecraft mentions the town as the site of a hospital where the titular character performs experiments during World War I.

== Gallery ==
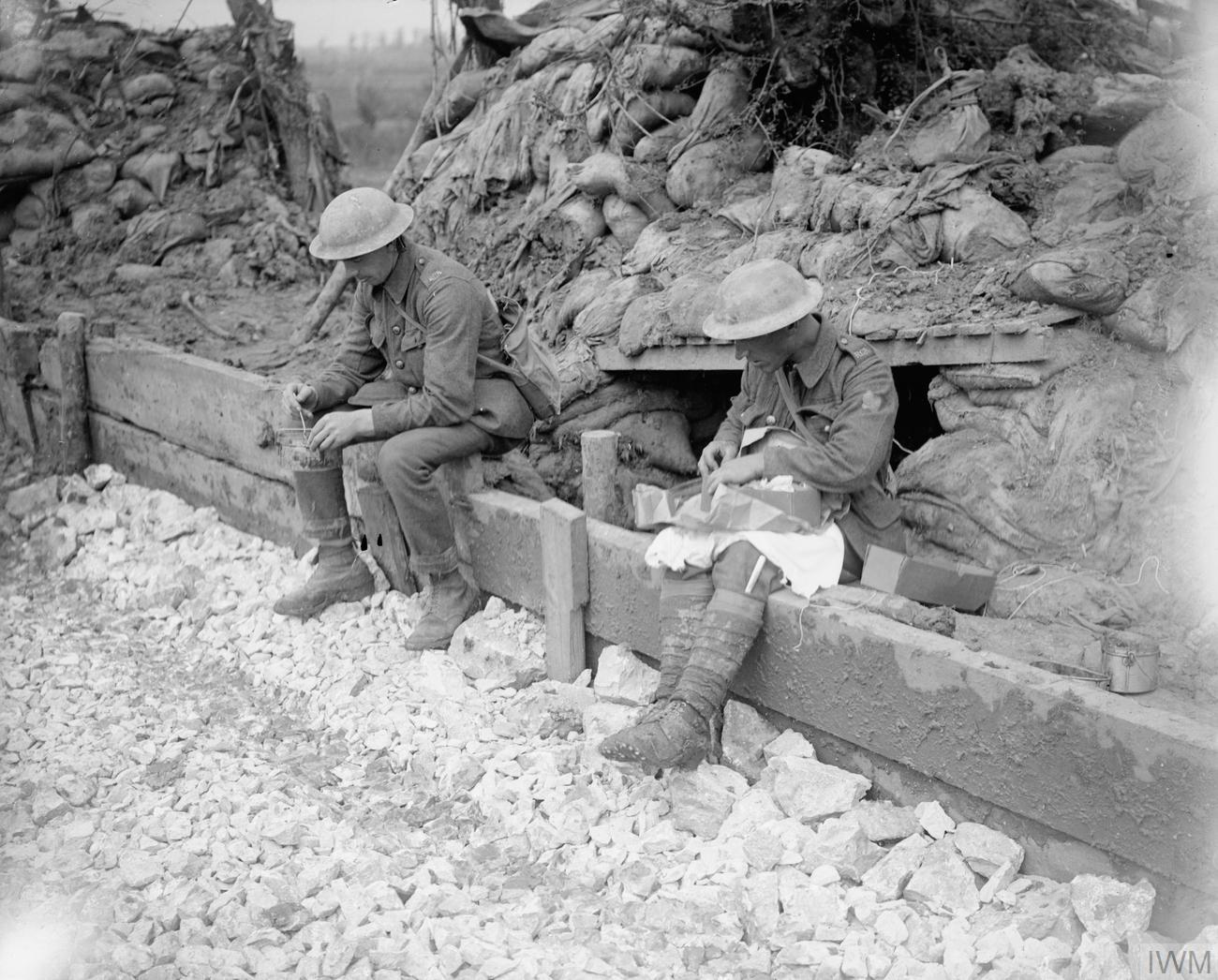
Royal Garrison Artillery gunners outside a shelter at St Eloi, 11 August 1917

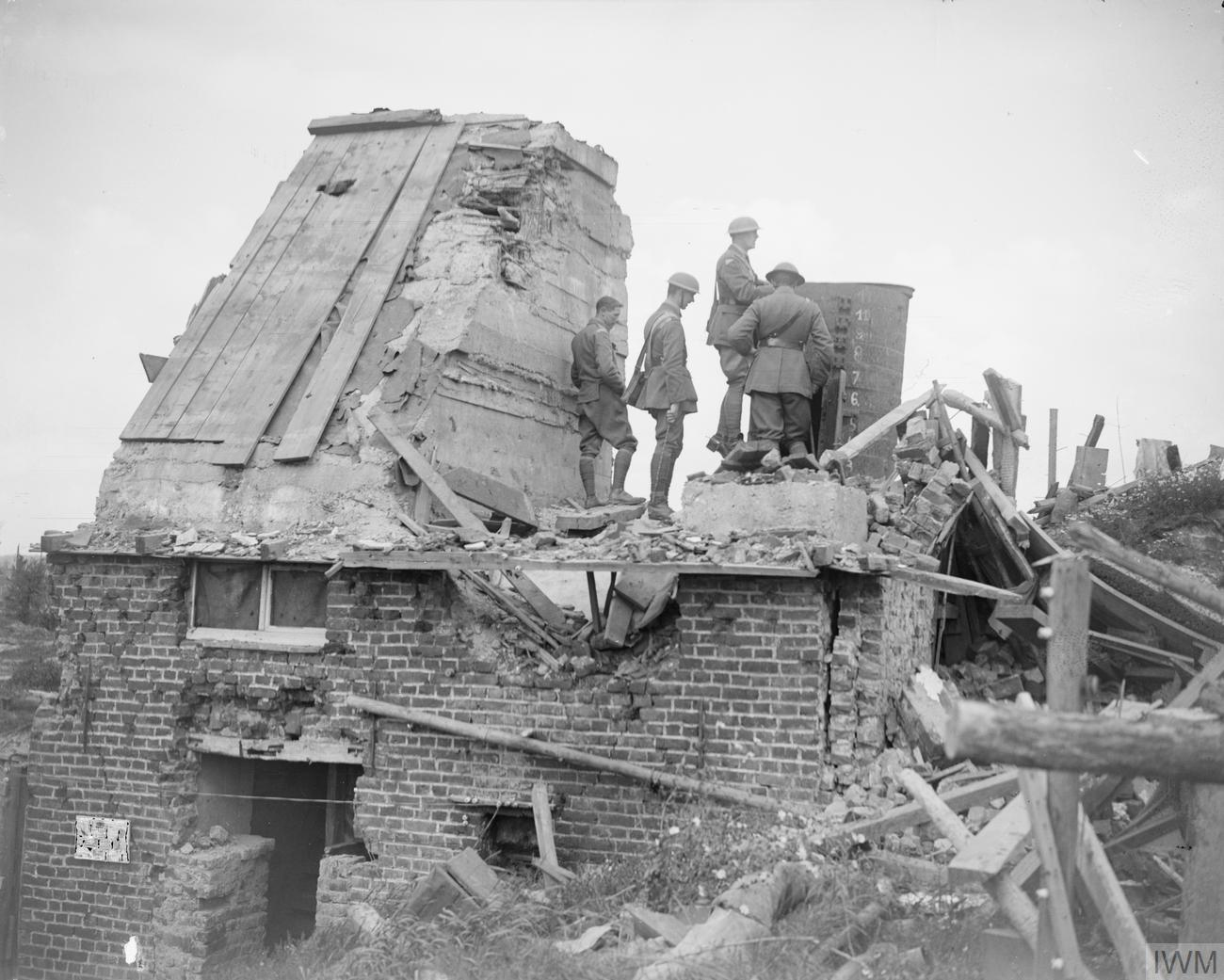
British officers in a captured German armoured observation post on a ruined house in St Eloi, 11 August 1917

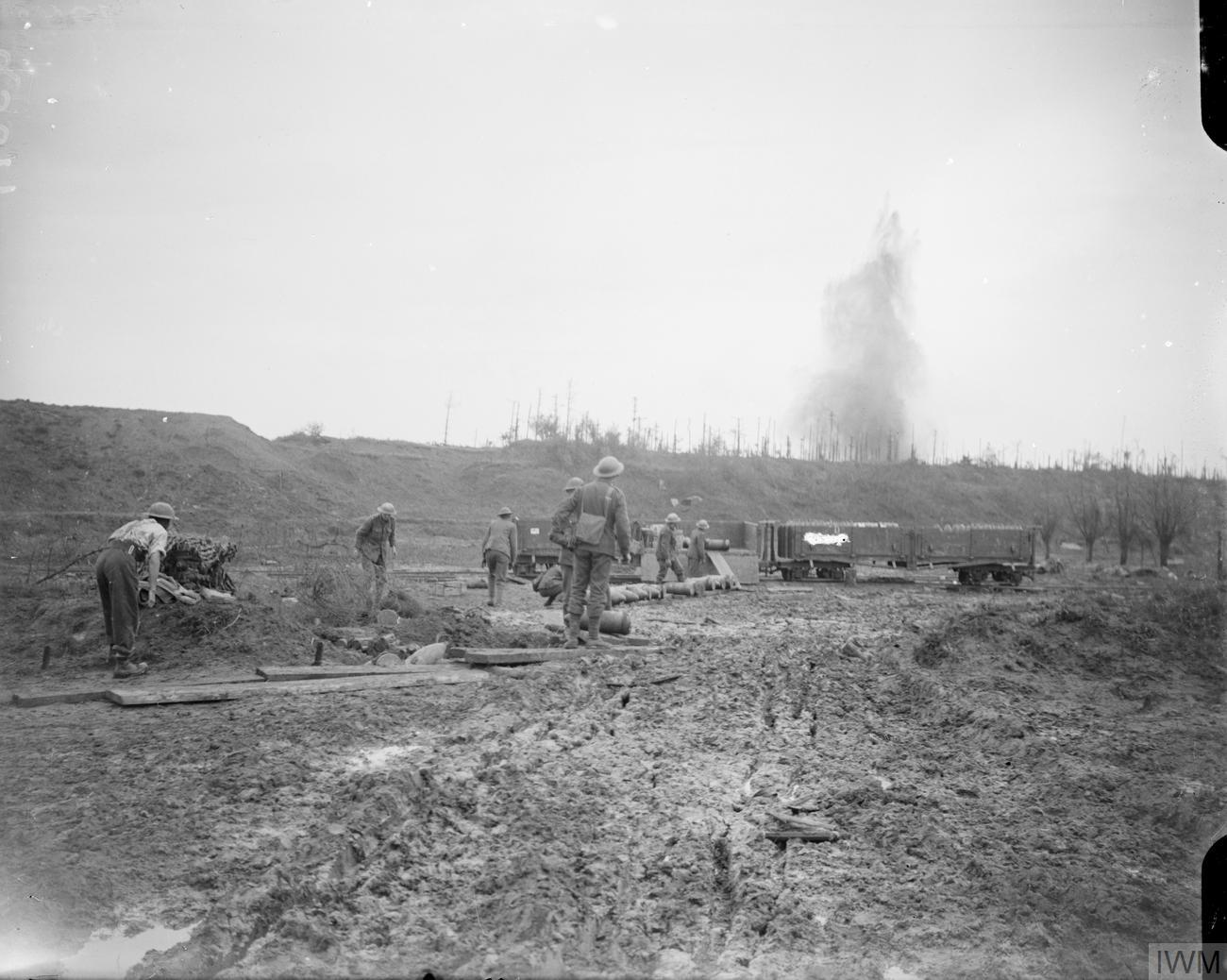
St. Eloi, 11 August 1917. A shell is bursting in the background

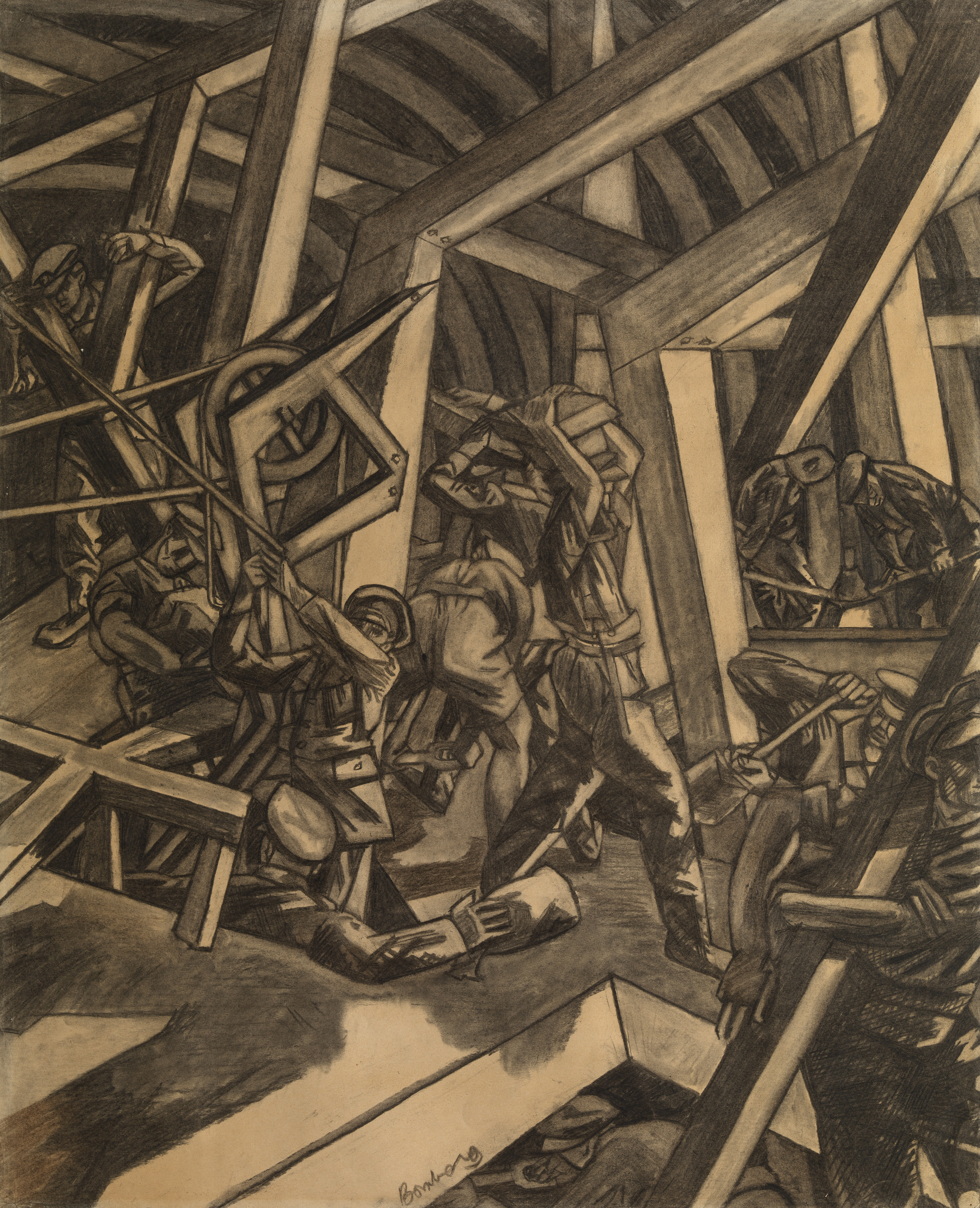
Sappers at Work: A Canadian Tunnelling Company, Hill 60, St Eloi by David Bomberg

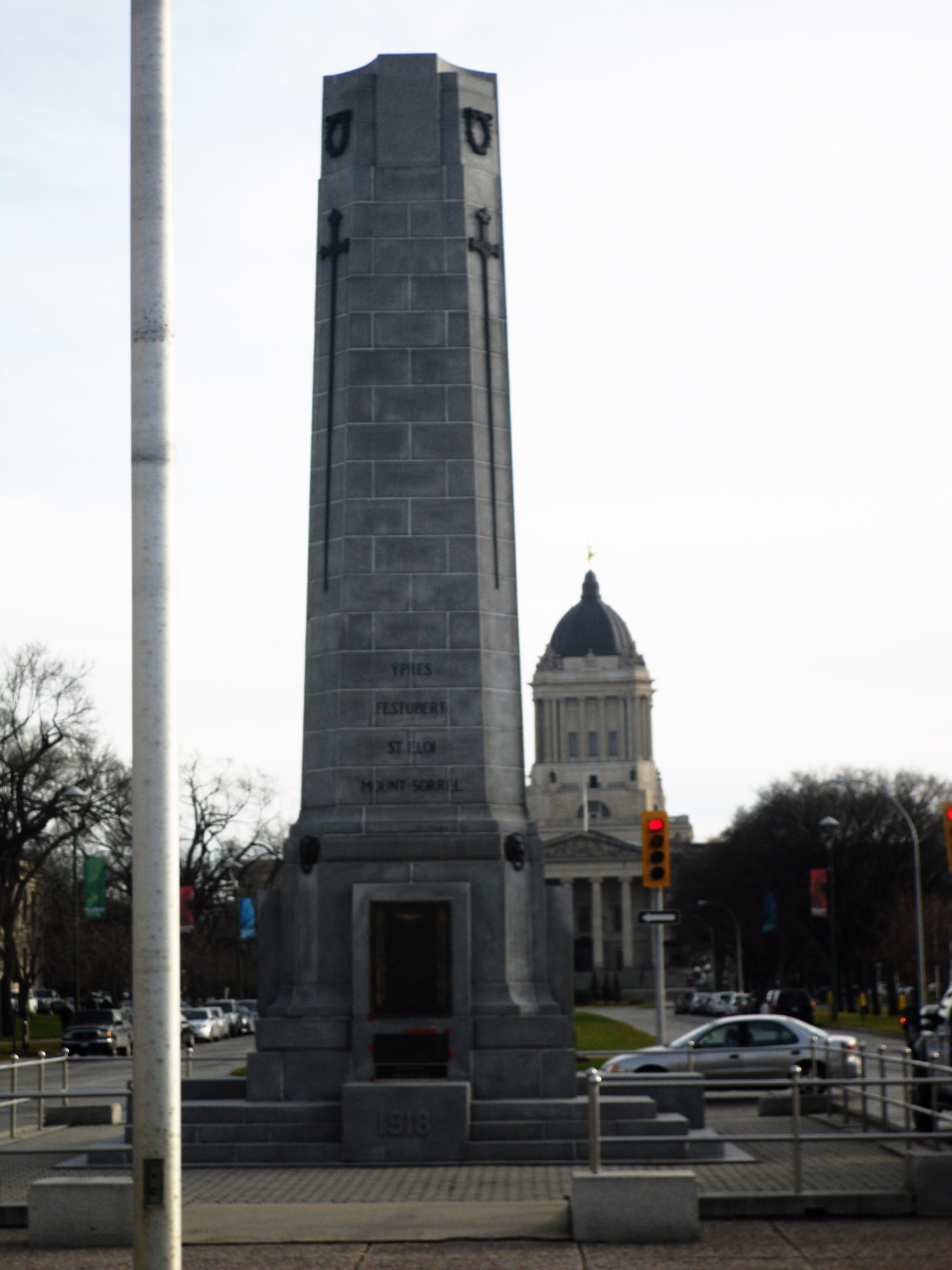
The Winnipeg Cenotaph, listing St Eloi 3rd from top

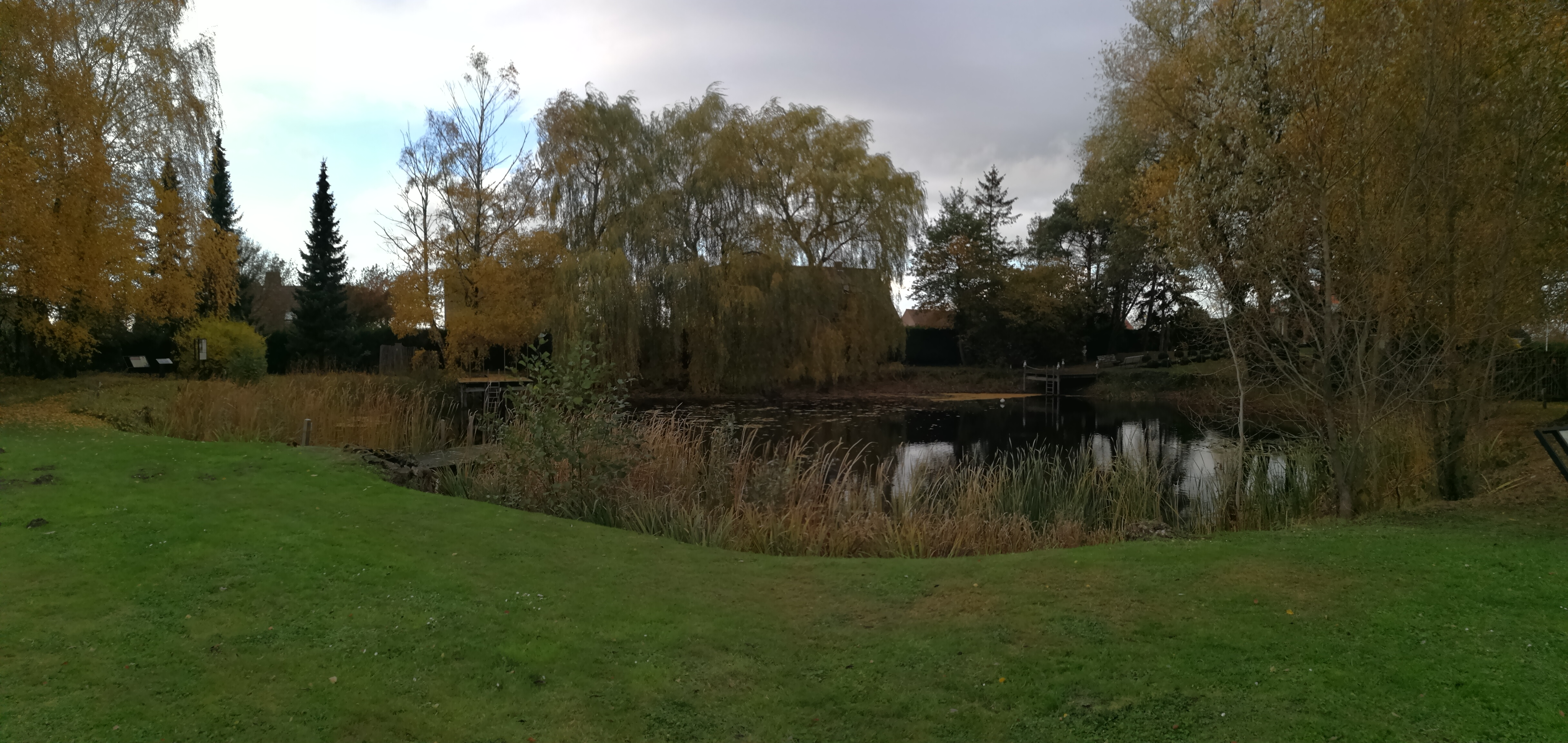
Mine crater in Sint-Elooi taken in panorama. The crater is now a bog between private land. It is possible to access the site from the road.

== See also ==
- Actions of St Eloi Craters
- Battle of Messines (1917)
- Mines in the Battle of Messines (1917)
- List of Canadian battles during the First World War
- St. Eloi Mountain, Canada
