= 46th Reserve Division =

46th Reserve Division (46. Reserve-Division)
- Active: 1914-1918
- Country: Germany
- Branch: Army
- Type: Infantry
- Size: Approx. 15,000
- Engagements: World War I: Battle of the Somme, Second Battle of the Aisne, Montdidier-Noyon Offensive, Second Battle of the Marne

The 46th Reserve Division (46. Reserve-Division) was a unit of the Imperial German Army in World War I. The division was formed in August 1914 and organized over the next two months. It was part of the first wave of new divisions formed at the outset of World War I, which were numbered the 43rd through 54th Reserve Divisions. The division was originally part of XXIII Reserve Corps. It was disbanded in August 1918.

== Recruitment ==
The 213th Reserve Infantry Regiment was raised in the Prussian Province of Schleswig-Holstein. The 214th Reserve Infantry Regiment was raised in the Grand Duchy of Mecklenburg-Schwerin, but included some troops from Lübeck and Schleswig-Holstein. The 215th Reserve Infantry Regiment was raised in the Prussian Province of Hanover. The 216th Reserve Infantry Regiment was raised primarily in Hamburg. The 18th Reserve Jäger Battalion was raised in Schleswig-Holstein and included many students from Kiel.

== Combat chronicle ==
The 46th Reserve Division fought on the Western Front, entering the line in October along the Yser and remaining there until April 1915, when it went into the fight for Ypres. The division remained in the Yser region until September 1916. In September, the division fought in the Battle of the Somme. Thereafter, it remained in the trenchlines in the Champagne until late December 1916, when it went to Lorraine. In April and May 1917, it fought in the Second Battle of the Aisne, also known as the Third Battle of Champagne (and to the Germans as the Double Battle on the Aisne and in the Champagne). The division fought in the Lorraine and Vosges region from December 1917 to April 1918. It then fought in the Montdidier-Noyon region including the German Montdidier-Noyon Offensive in June. It later saw action in the Second Battle of the Marne. The division was disbanded in August 1918. In 1917, Allied intelligence rated the division as a good division and in 1918 it was rated second class, but it was noted that its strength had been allowed to diminish without replenishment, leading to its dissolution.

== Order of battle on formation ==
The 46th Reserve Division was initially organized as a square division, with essentially the same organization as the reserve divisions formed on mobilization. The order of battle of the 46th Reserve Division on September 10, 1914, was as follows:

- 91. Reserve-Infanterie-Brigade
  - Reserve-Infanterie-Regiment Nr. 213
  - Reserve-Infanterie-Regiment Nr. 215
- 92. Reserve-Infanterie-Brigade
  - Reserve-Infanterie-Regiment Nr. 214
  - Reserve-Infanterie-Regiment Nr. 216
  - Reserve-Jäger-Bataillon Nr. 18
- Reserve-Kavallerie-Abteilung Nr. 46
- Reserve-Feldartillerie-Regiment Nr. 46
- Reserve-Pionier-Kompanie Nr. 46

== Order of battle on February 8, 1918 ==
The 46th Reserve Division was triangularized in September 1916. Over the course of the war, other changes took place, including the formation of artillery and signals commands and a pioneer battalion. The order of battle on February 8, 1918, was as follows:

- 92. Reserve-Infanterie-Brigade
  - Reserve-Infanterie-Regiment Nr. 214
  - Reserve-Infanterie-Regiment Nr. 215
  - Reserve-Infanterie-Regiment Nr. 216
- Reserve-Kavallerie-Abteilung Nr. 46
- Artillerie-Kommandeur 46
  - Reserve-Feldartillerie-Regiment Nr. 46
  - III.Bataillon/Reserve-Fußartillerie-Regiment Nr. 24
- Pionier-Bataillon Nr. 346
- Divisions-Nachrichten-Kommandeur 446
