= Chris Alexander =

Chris or Christopher Alexander may refer to:

- Christopher James Alexander (1887–1917), English ornithologist
- Christopher Alexander (1936–2022), British-American architect and design theorist
- Chris Alexander (politician) (born 1968), Canadian politician
- Chris Alexander (editor), Canadian editor of Fangoria magazine and horror film director

== See also ==
- Cris Alexander (1920–2012), American actor, singer, dancer, designer, and photographer
