= Cactoblastis doddi =

Scientific classification
- Domain: Eukaryota
- Kingdom: Animalia
- Phylum: Arthropoda
- Class: Insecta
- Order: Lepidoptera
- Family: Pyralidae
- Genus: Cactoblastis
- Species: C. doddi

Binomial name
- Cactoblastis doddi Heinrich, 1939

Synonyms
- Cactoblastis bucyrus Dodd, 1927 (not Dyar, 1927)

Species of moth

Cactoblastis doddi is a species of snout moth in the genus Cactoblastis. It was described by Carl Heinrich in 1939 and is known from Argentina, along the eastern edge and foothills of the Andes from Mendoza to the northern boundary Argentina, and probably into southern Bolivia.

The larvae feed on Opuntia sulphurea and Opuntia ficus-indica.
