= Wilfrid Backhouse Alexander =

English ornithologist and entomologist

Wilfrid Backhouse Alexander (4 February 1885 – 18 December 1965) was an English ornithologist and entomologist. He was a brother of Horace Alexander and Christopher James Alexander.

Alexander was born at Croydon in Surrey, England in 1885, and was introduced to natural history by his two uncles, James and Albert Crosfield. He was educated at Bootham School in York and Tonbridge School in Kent, and went on to study Natural Science at Cambridge University. During this time his main interest was botany, graduating in 1909 with first class honours.

== Career ==
After graduation he stayed in Cambridge for a short time working as assistant superintendent of the Cambridge University Museum of Zoology and assistant demonstrator in Zoology and Comparative Anatomy for Cambridge University. In 1911, he took a job with the Board of Agriculture and Fisheries as an assistant naturalist on an international exploration of the North Sea, but in August that year, he obtained the appointment of Assistant at the Western Australian Museum. He moved to Australia in early 1912 to take up the position, which he held for three years before being made Keeper of Biology at the museum.

=== Australia ===
He made a number of expeditions to collect material for the museum including the Percy Sladen Trust Expedition to the Abrolhos Islands in 1913. He became Honorary Secretary of and co-editor of the journal of the Royal Society of Western Australia in 1914. In 1916, the museum was under severe financial pressure and Alexander was granted leave without pay to take up a position as science abstractor to the Advisory Council of Science and Industry in Melbourne. He held this position until 1919, when he returned to the Western Australian Museum for a short time. During this period he also acted as librarian to the Royal Australasian Ornithologists Union, which he became vice-president of from 1923 to 1925. He was also editor of the union's journal, Emu, from 1924 to 1925.

In 1920 the Commonwealth Prickly Pear Board was formed with the purpose of finding a way to control the several species of Opuntia that were taking over vast areas of subtropical eastern Australia and W. B. Alexander was appointed biologist to the board. The project took him on visits to North and South America in search of a suitable insect agent and in 1924 he was promoted to Officer-in-charge. The result of these overseas investigations was the highly successful use of Cactoblastis moths in controlling the Opuntia species in Australia and also arousing his interest in oceanic birds. So when he left Australia in 1926 he spent most of the year at the American Museum of Natural History preparing the book Birds of the Ocean (1928), a forerunner of later field guides, before returning to England.

=== Edward Grey Institute of Field Ornithology ===
He had no regular employment from 1926 until he was appointed superintendent of the Marine Biological Association’s Tees Estuary survey in 1929. Then in 1930 he was appointed Director of the Oxford Bird Census which developed into the Oxford University Research in Economic Ornithology in 1931, then an Institute of Field Ornithology, funded by the newly formed British Trust for Ornithology in 1933. In 1938, it was officially recognized by Oxford University as the Edward Grey Institute of Field Ornithology. In 1945 he retired as director and became the institute's librarian, remaining so until 1955. The donation of his personal collection of bird books had provided the original nucleus of the library, and it was named after him in 1947.

He was awarded the Tucker Medal of the British Trust for Ornithology in 1955 and the Union Medal of the British Ornithologists' Union in 1959.

He spent his retirement in Parkstone, Dorset, southern England, where he died on 8 December 1965.
