= Cactoblastis bucyrus =

Scientific classification
- Kingdom: Animalia
- Phylum: Arthropoda
- Class: Insecta
- Order: Lepidoptera
- Family: Pyralidae
- Genus: Cactoblastis
- Species: C. bucyrus

Binomial name
- Cactoblastis bucyrus Dyar, 1922

Species of moth

Cactoblastis bucyrus is a species of snout moth in the genus Cactoblastis. It was described by Harrison Gray Dyar Jr. in 1922, and is known from Argentina (Tucumán, Tapia, Mendoza, Catamarca, Andalgalá).

The larvae feed on Trichocereus, Echinopsis and Denmoza species.
