= Hooge Crater Commonwealth War Graves Commission Cemetery =

WWI CWGC cemetery in Ypres, Belgium

Hooge Crater
- Commonwealth War Graves Commission
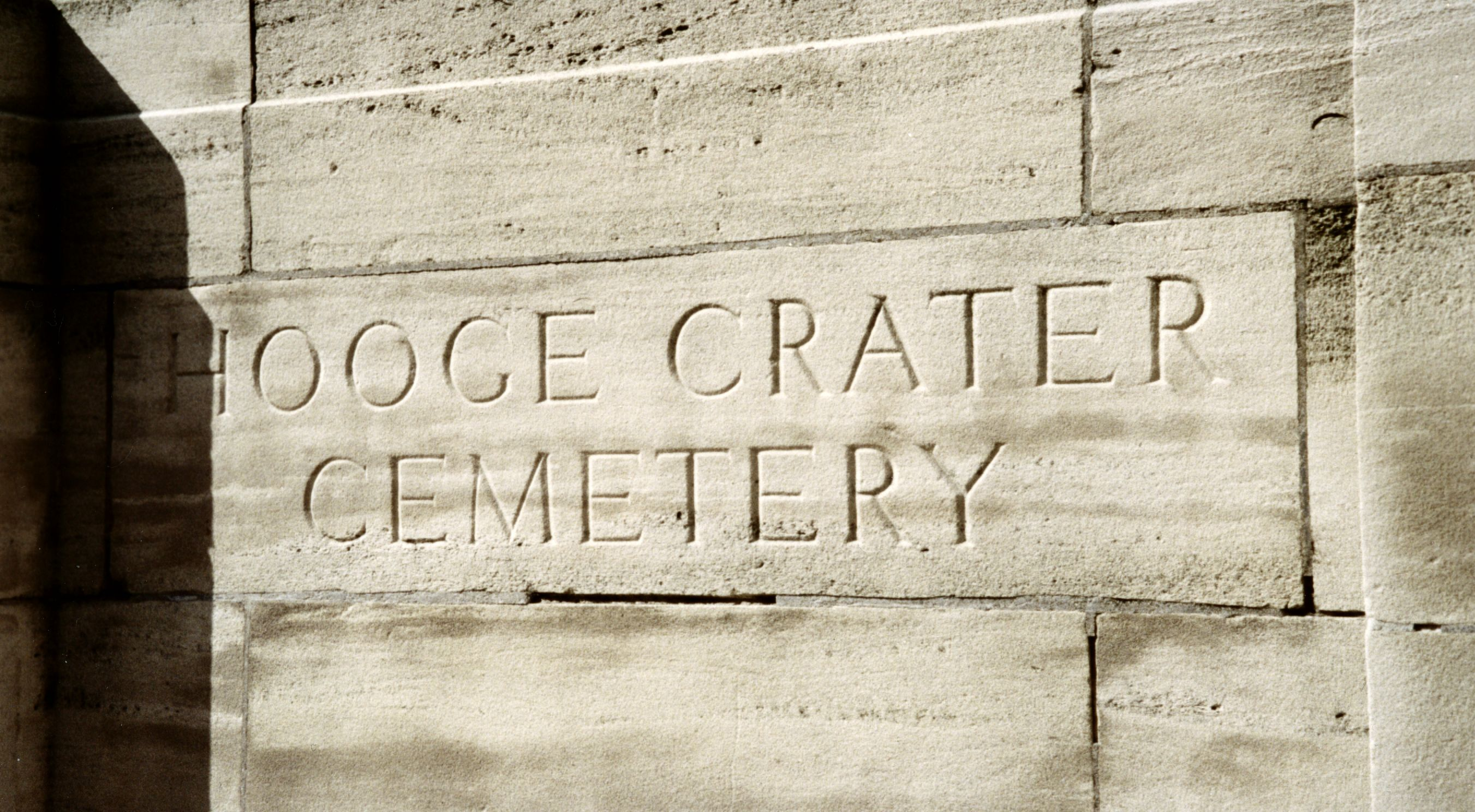
- Used for those deceased 1917–1918
- Established: October 1917
- Location: 50°50′47″N 2°56′36″E near Ypres, West Flanders, Belgium
- Designed by: Sir Edwin Lutyens
- Total burials: 5924
- Unknowns: 3578

Burials by nation
- Allied Powers: United Kingdom: 5153; Australia: 509; New Zealand: 119; Canada: 95; British West Indies: 2

Burials by war
- World War I: 5924

Hooge Crater Cemetery is a Commonwealth War Graves Commission burial ground for the dead of the First World War located in the Ypres Salient in Belgium on the Western Front. Hooge Crater Cemetery is named after a mine crater blown nearby in 1915 (since filled in, see below) and located near the centre of Hooge, opposite the "Hooge Crater Museum" (founded in 1994) and separated from it by the Menin Road. Hooge itself is a small village on the Bellewaerde Ridge, about 4 kilometres east of Ypres in the Flemish province of West Flanders.

== Location ==
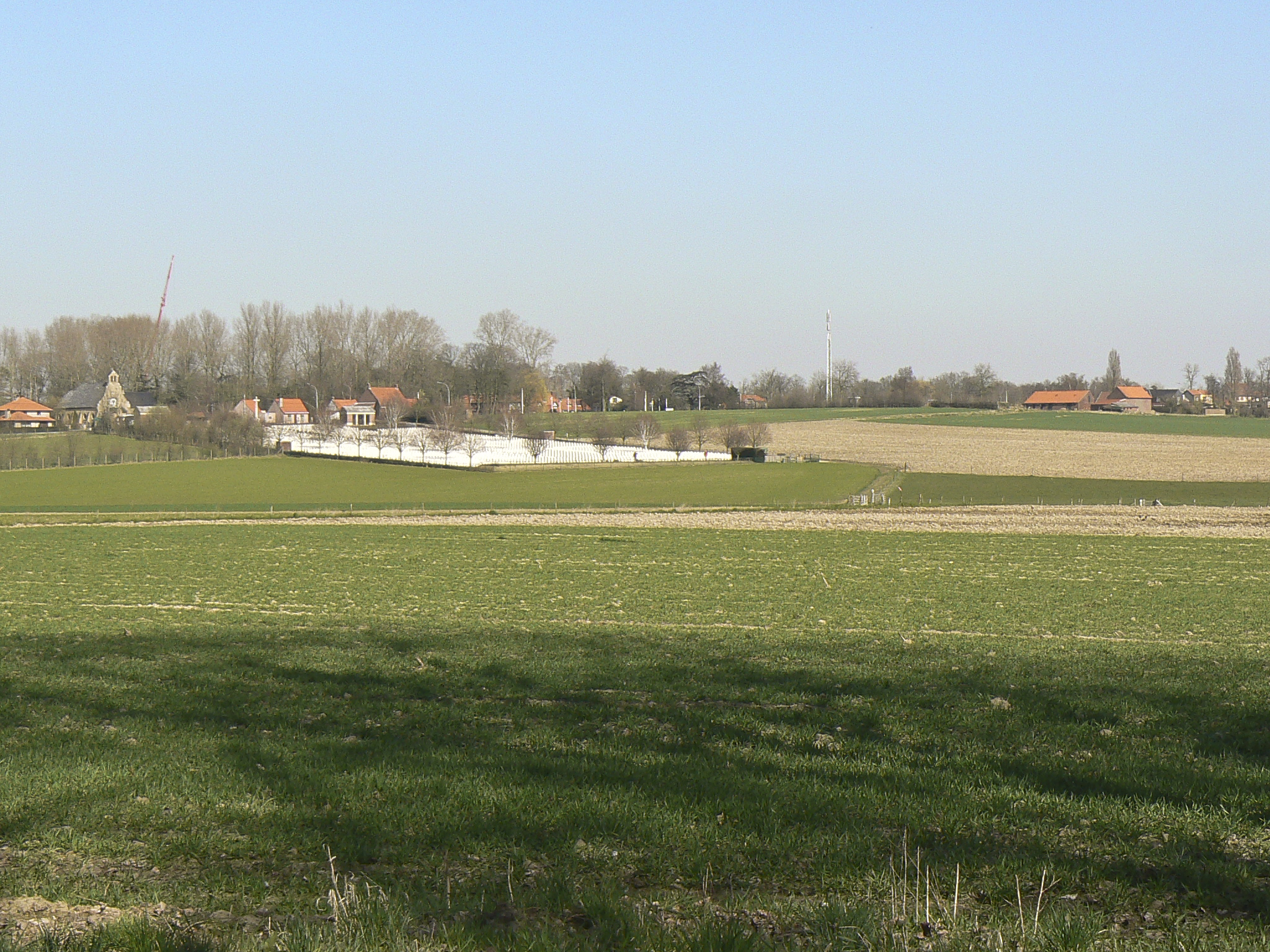
View of Hooge from the south, with the military cemetery clearly visible

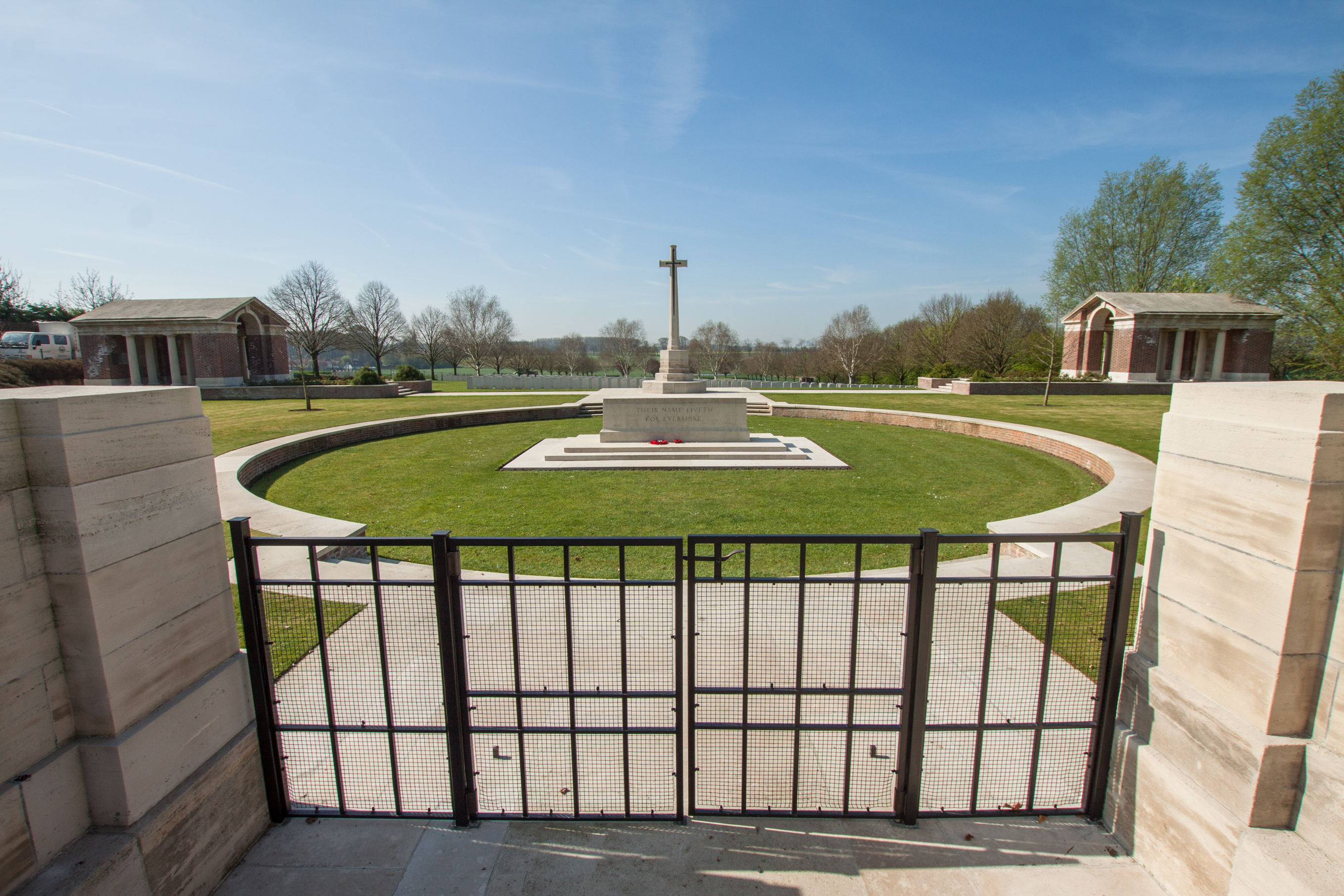
Cemetery entrance with Cross of Sacrifice and the stone-faced circle designed by Sir Edwin Lutyens in memory of the many craters nearby

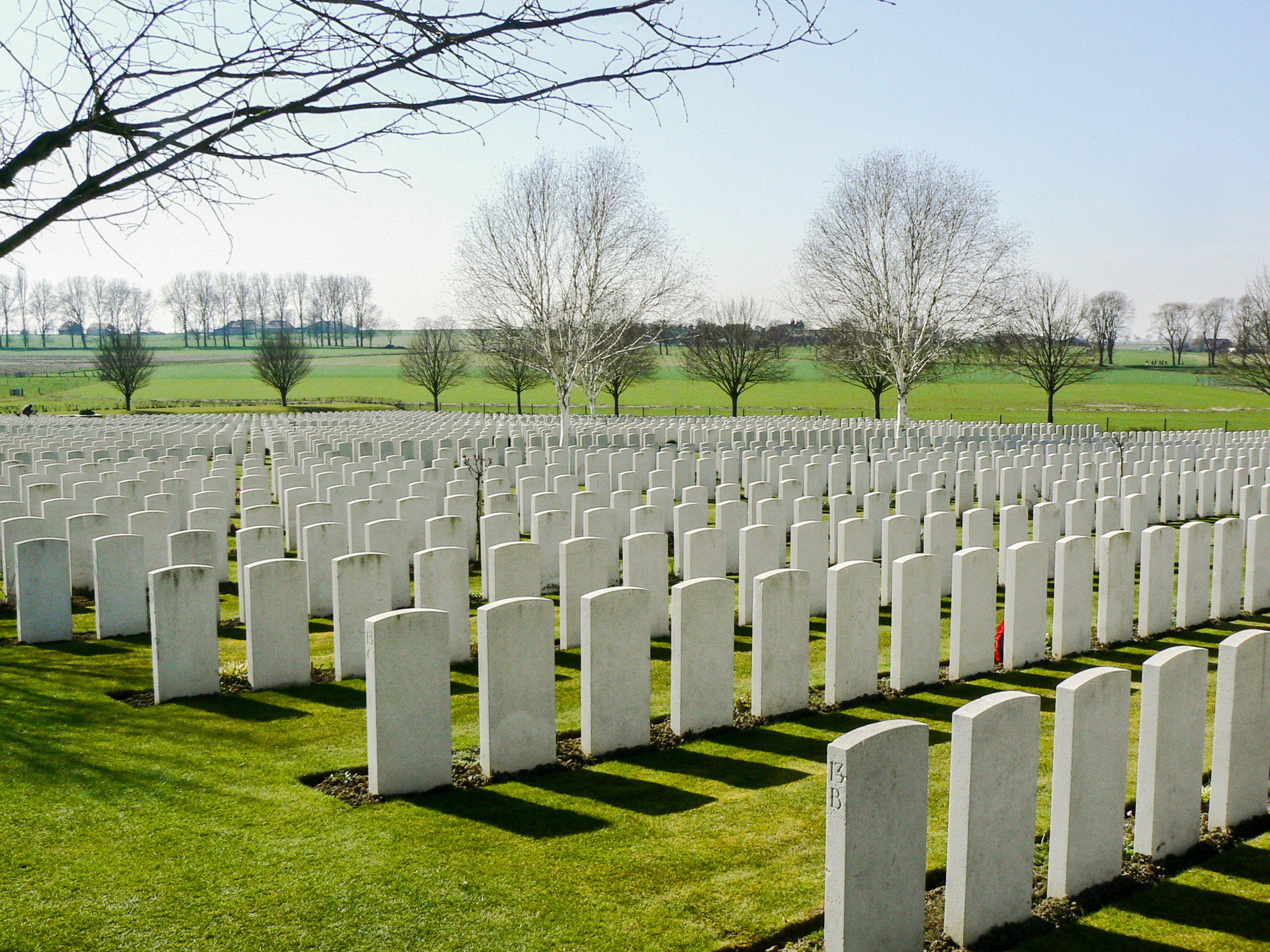
View of the cemetery

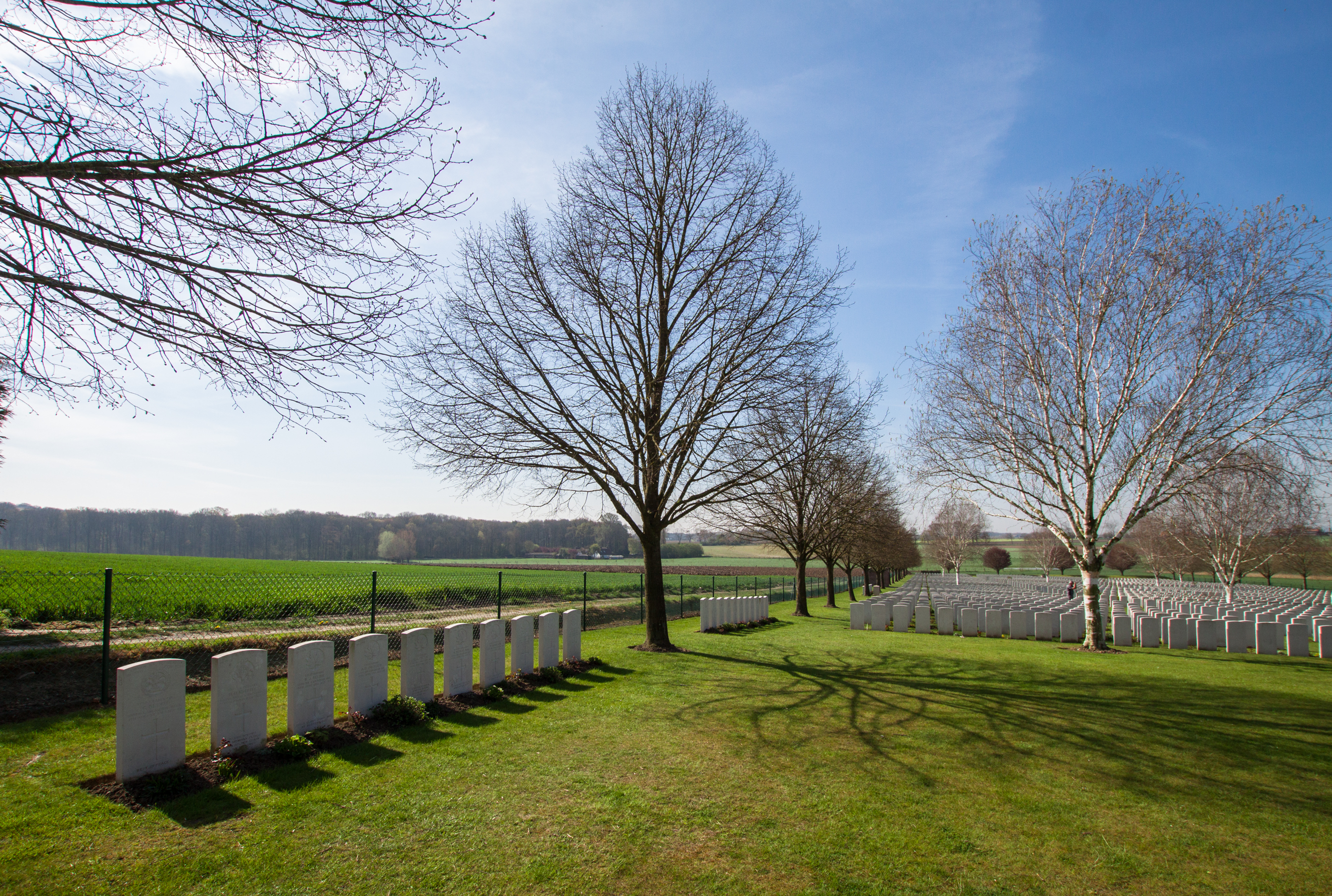
Section of the cemetery grounds with location of a deep dugout made by 177th Tunnelling Company

In World War I, the Flanders village of Hooge belonged to one of the easternmost sectors of the Ypres Salient, which made it the site of intense and sustained fighting between German and Allied forces. From 1914 the front line of the Salient ran through the Hooge area and there was almost constant fighting in the area over the next three years, during which the village was totally destroyed.

Hooge was the site of a château which was used by the British Army as the divisional headquarters for the area. Several senior British officers from the 1st and 2nd Divisions were killed when the Château de Hooge was shelled by German units on 31 October 1914. German forces attacked the château from 24 May 1915, and, despite the detonation of a mine by the 175th Tunnelling Company (operating with the 3rd Division) on 19 July 1915, leaving a massive crater, took control of the château and the surrounding area on 30 July. This mine was only the second British offensive underground attack in the Ypres Salient; 173rd Tunnelling Company had blown five mines at Hill 60 on 17 April 1915, but none of these mines were even half as powerful as the Hooge charge. Following the detonation of the mine on 19 July 1915, the Château de Hooge and the craters (being strategically important in relatively flat countryside) were taken by the British 6th Division on 9 August.

The area was reclaimed by the Germans on 16 June 1916 and retaken by the British on 31 July 1917 when the 8th Division managed to push past it by about a mile. Several large craters from underground mines were blown over the course of the 1917 fighting. The Germans retook Hooge in April 1918 as part of the Spring Offensive but were expelled from the area by the British on 28 September as the Offensive faltered. The Château de Hooge was completely destroyed along with the entire village.

== Foundation ==
The cemetery was begun in October 1917 by the 7th Division. Originally containing 76 graves, the cemetery was expanded by the concentration of graves from the surrounding battlefields and from nearby smaller cemeteries.

The cemetery grounds were assigned to the United Kingdom in perpetuity by the King of the Belgians in recognition of the sacrifices made by the British Empire in the defence and liberation of Belgium during the war.

Beneath the cemetery grounds opposite the "Hooge Crater Museum" are the remains of a deep dugout constructed by 177th Tunnelling Company beneath the Menin Road in the centre of Hooge, occupying the space in between 175th TC's July 1915 mine crater and the stables of the destroyed Château de Hooge.

The current cemetery layout was designed by Sir Edwin Lutyens and has an unusual feature in the stone-faced circular depression at the entrance that evokes the nearby craters at Hooge, Bellewaerde Ridge and Railway Wood, many of which are now lost. The original Hooge Crater, created nearby on 19 July 1915 by the mine fired by 175th Tunnelling Company, was filled in later in the war as the repository of hundreds of bodies and untenable.

The water filled crater visible near the Bellewaarde Hotel today is the result of Baron de Wynck, who landscaped three German mine craters blown in June 1916 as part of their offensive against the Canadians.

== Notable graves ==
- Private Christopher James Alexander, English ornithologist, mortally wounded near Passchendaele on 4 October 1917.
- Private Patrick Joseph Bugden, an Australian recipient of the Victoria Cross, killed on 28 September 1917 at Polygon Wood.
- Major Albert Stewart, Irish international rugby player, killed on 4 October 1917 during the Battle of Broodseinde.

== Gallery ==
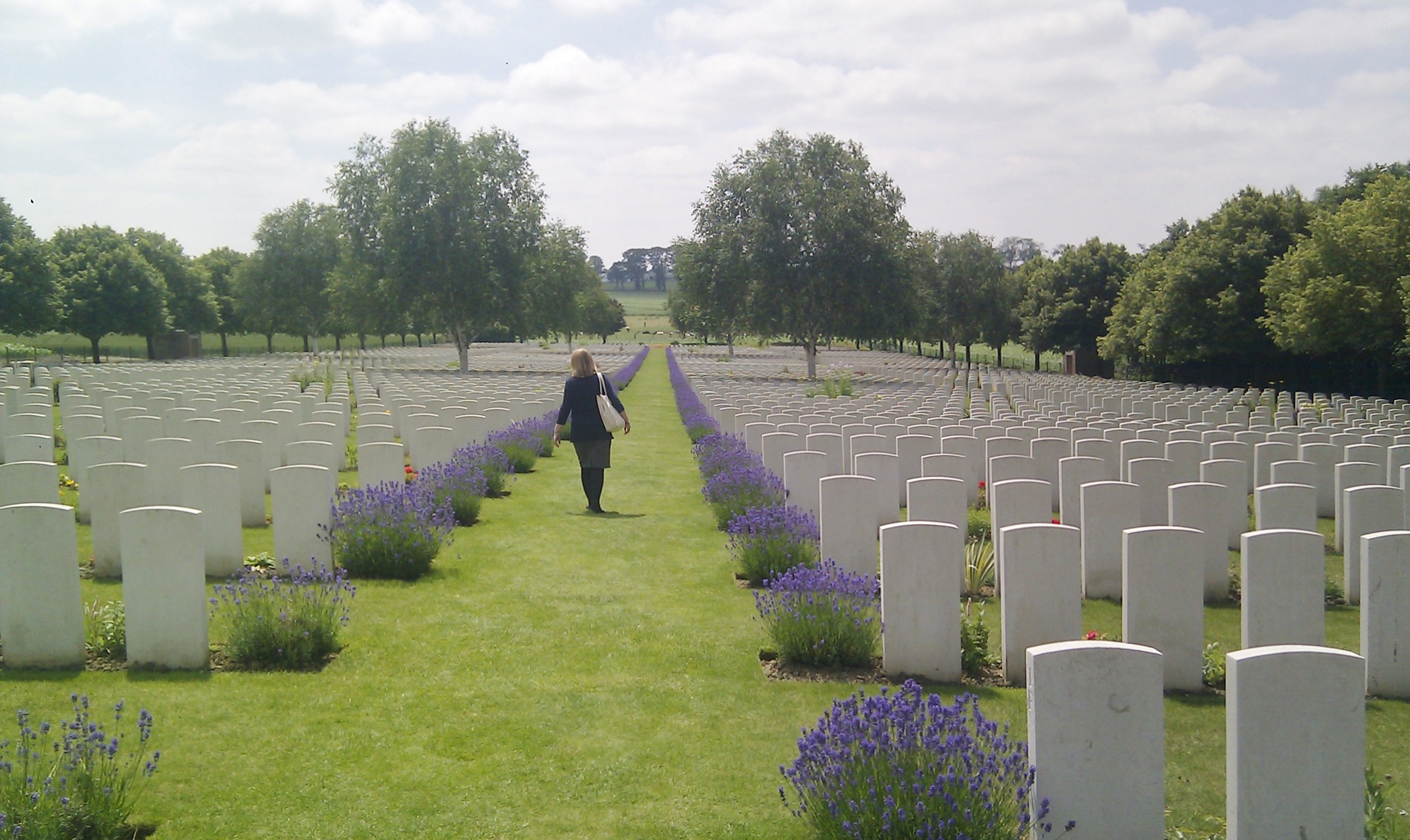
View of the cemetery from the Cross of Sacrifice

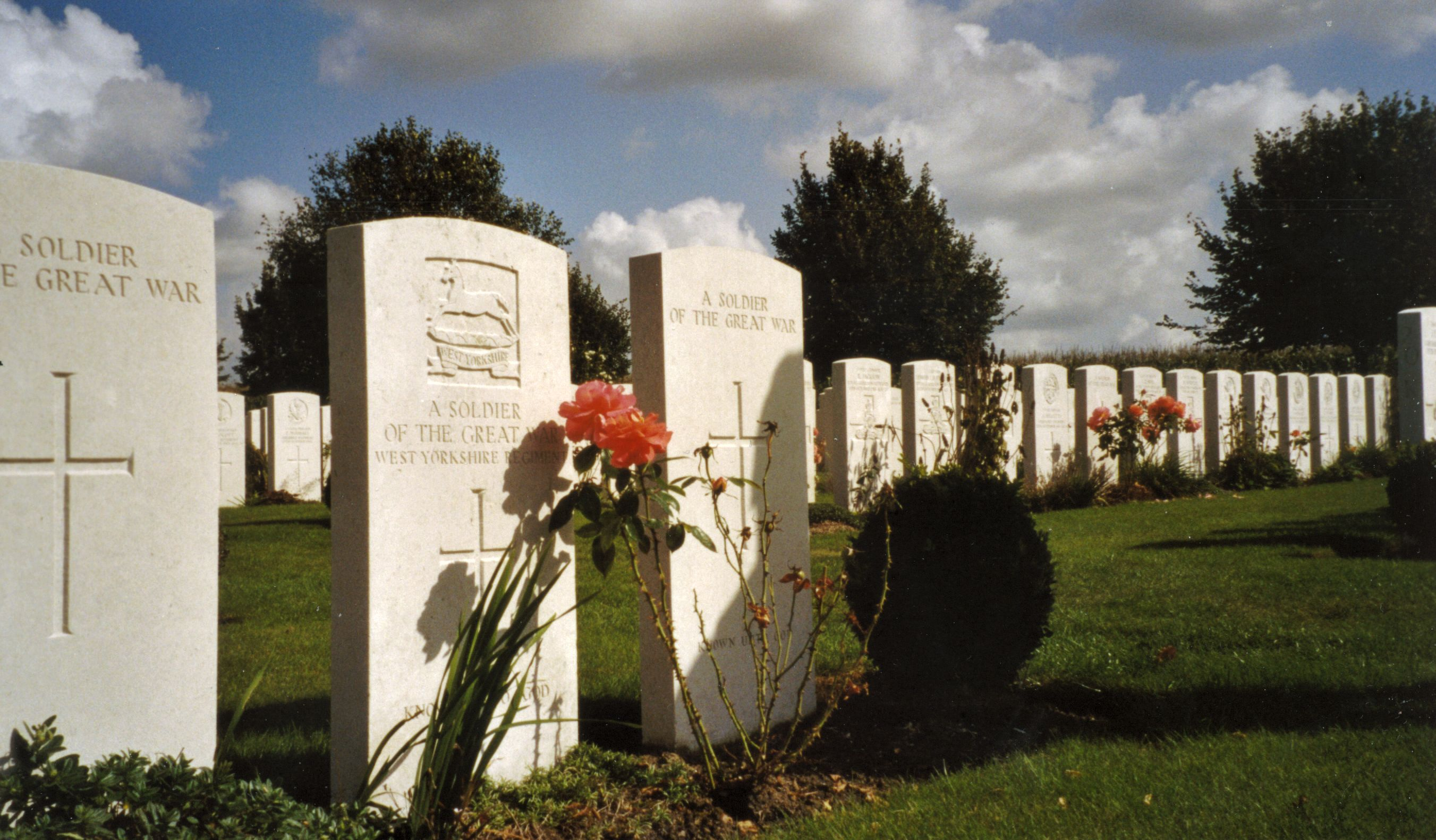
Three unknown soldiers – one from the West Yorkshire Regiment

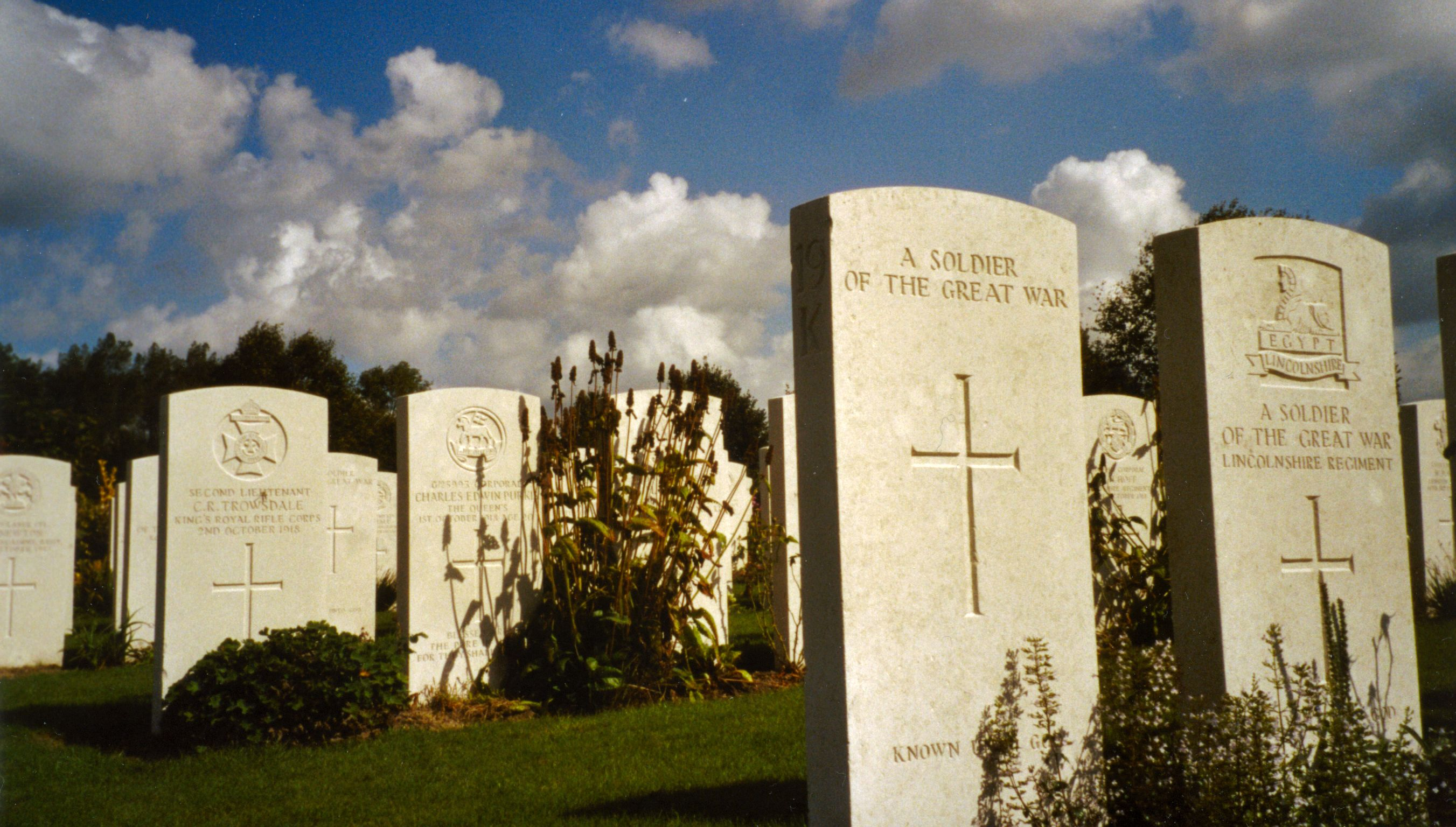
Two unknown soldiers – one from the Lincolnshire Regiment

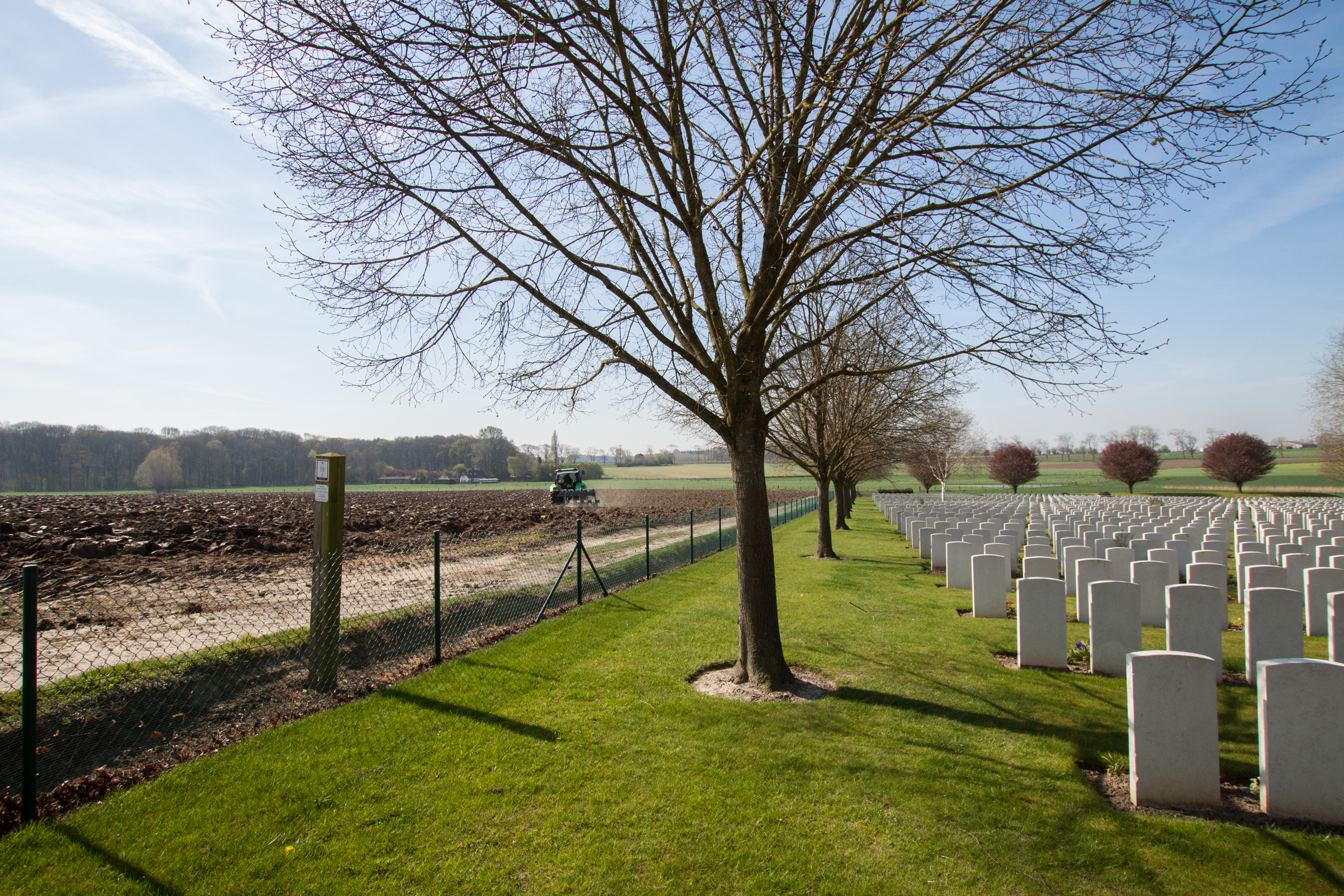
View of Hooge Crater Cemetery

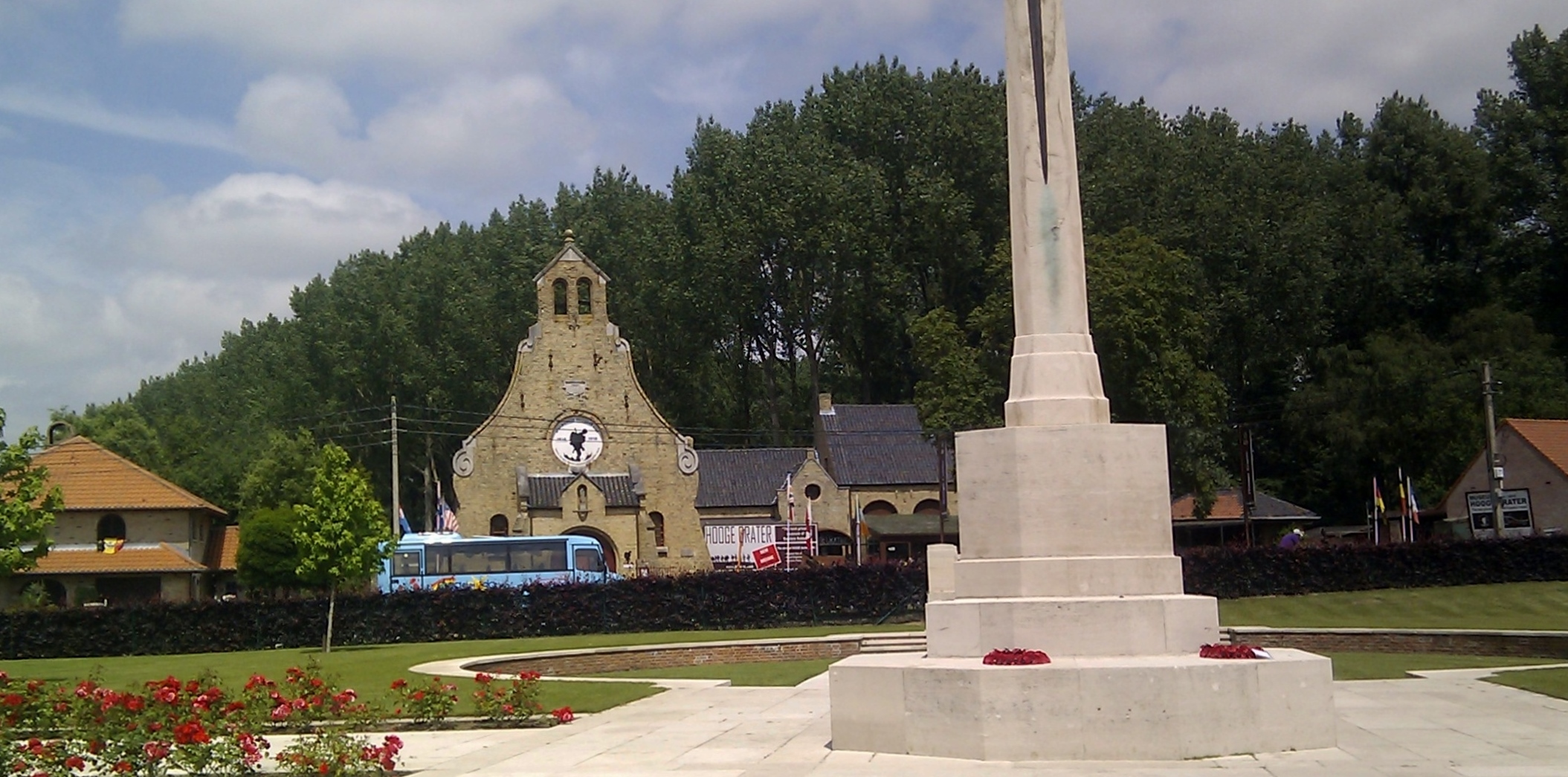
View from the cemetery towards the old chapel now housing the Hooge Crater Museum
