= Cactoblastis mundelli =

Scientific classification
- Domain: Eukaryota
- Kingdom: Animalia
- Phylum: Arthropoda
- Class: Insecta
- Order: Lepidoptera
- Family: Pyralidae
- Genus: Cactoblastis
- Species: C. mundelli

Binomial name
- Cactoblastis mundelli Heinrich, 1939

Species of moth

Cactoblastis mundelli is a species of snout moth in the genus Cactoblastis. It was described by Carl Heinrich in 1939 and is known from Peru.

Males have dull white hindwings with a faint smoky tint. The forewings have an ocherous suffusion.

The larvae feed on Austrocylindropuntia subulata.
