= Albert Stewart (rugby union) =

Ireland international rugby union player (1889-1917)

- Born: Albert Lewis Stewart; 19 February 1889 Belfast, Ireland, United Kingdom
- Died: 4 October 1917 (aged 28) Broodseinde, Passchendaele salient, Belgium
- Height: 6 ft 2 in (188 cm)
- Weight: 14 st (89 kg)
- University: Royal Belfast Academical Institution

Rugby union career
- Position: Centre
Senior career
Years	Team	Apps	(Points)
1907–1914	North of Ireland Football Club		
International career
Years	Team	Apps	(Points)
1913–1914	Ireland	3	(3)
- Military career
- Burial place: Hooge Crater Cemetery, Flanders, Belgium
- Allegiance: United Kingdom
- Branch: British Army
- Service years: 1914–1917
- Rank: Major
- Units: Royal Irish Rifles; Machine Gun Corps
- Conflicts: World War I; Battle of the Somme; First day on the Somme; Battle of Passchendaele; Battle of Broodseinde †
- Awards: Mentioned in Dispatches (1916, 1917); Distinguished Service Order (1918)

Albert Lewis Stewart, DSO (19 February 1889 – 4 October 1917) was an Irish rugby union player and decorated British Army officer. He played for North of Ireland Football Club from 1907 to 1914, and made three appearances for the Ireland national rugby union team. During World War I, he served in the Royal Irish Rifles and the Machine Gun Corps. He was killed in action in the Battle of Broodseinde during the Battle of Passchendaele.

== Early life ==
Stewart was born on 19 February 1889 in Belfast, Ireland, to James and Isabella Stewart. His father was a solicitor. Between 1902 and 1907, he was educated at the Royal Belfast Academical Institution, an all-boys grammar school in Belfast.

== Sporting career ==
=== School level ===
Stewart started playing rugby union while he was still at school. From 1903 to 1907, he played for the first XV of the Royal Belfast Academical Institution. He played as a full back in his first year on the team, then switched to playing as a centre for the remaining years. From 1905 to 1907, he also played for Ulster in the schools' inter-provincial competition.

In addition to rugby, Stewart played a number of other sports while at school. From 1904 to 1906, he played cricket with his school's first XI. He was both a good batsman and a good fielder. He was also a successful swimmer, specialising in the relay. He was part of the team who won the junior gymnastics competition in 1904, and personally won a number of prizes for sprinting.

=== Club level ===
After leaving school in 1907, Stewart joined the North of Ireland Football Club (NIFC), a rugby union club based in Belfast. He played centre. In 1909, his team won the Ulster Senior League, and he was awarded the NIFC Honour Cap. He served as Vice-Captain of his club in the 1911/1912 season, and was Captain of his club in the 1913/1914 season.

=== Rugby international ===
In February 1913, Stewart was selected to play for the Ireland national rugby union team. He achieved three caps during his international career, and would have achieved more if it wasn't for the outbreak of World War I in 1914. He scored a try in his debut international match.

He played in the following matches:

Opposition	Score	Result	Date	Venue	Ref(s)
Wales	13–16	Lost	8 March 1913	St. Helen's, Swansea	
France	24–0	Won	24 March 1913	Mardyke, Cork	
France	8–6	Won	1 January 1914	Parc des Princes, Paris	

== Military service ==
In September 1914, Stewart applied for a commission in the British Army. He was commissioned into the Royal Irish Rifles as a second lieutenant on 22 September 1914. He was assigned to the 10th Service Battalion (South Belfast Volunteers), Royal Irish Rifles. He then underwent training at Newcastle, County Down. On 23 November 1914, he was made a temporary lieutenant. Next, he was posted to Ballykinlar Camp, Ballykinlar, County Down, as part of the 36th (Ulster) Division. In Spring 1915, he was appointed his battalion's Machine Gun Officer. In May 1915, he and the division moved to Seaford, Sussex, England. From there, they moved to Bramshott Camp, a temporary army camp on Bramshott Common, Hampshire. On 25 August 1915, he was promoted to temporary major.

Stewart spent the first year of his military service, serving within the United Kingdom. On 1 October 1915, he and his battalion departed for France and the Western Front. On 18 December 1915, he was transferred to the Machine Gun Corps in the rank of temporary lieutenant with seniority from 23 November 1914. He was involved in fighting during the winter of 1915/1916.

On 1 July 1916, the Battle of the Somme began. Stewart saw action and survived the deadliest day the British Army had ever seen (roughly 60,000 casualties, with 20,000 men killed). On 10 July 1916, he was promoted to temporary captain, and appointed officer commanding the 22nd Machine Gun Company. On 1 January 1917, he was promoted to temporary major.

=== Death ===
Stewart was killed in action on 4 October 1917 during the Battle of Broodseinde near Ypres, Belgium. He had been fighting in Glencorse Wood and was trying to seize ground from the Germans when he was killed. He was aged 28.

Stewart was buried in Hooge Crater Cemetery, a Commonwealth War Graves Commission burial ground in Flanders, Belgium.

== Personal life ==
Stewart was a Presbyterian Christian and was a member of the Windsor Presbyterian Church in Belfast, Northern Ireland.

== Honours ==
For action during the Battle of the Somme, Stewart was recommended for the Victoria Cross (the highest award for bravery in the face of the enemy), but the award was not approved. He was mentioned in despatches twice; in 1916 and in 1917. On 1 January 1918, he was posthumously awarded the Distinguished Service Order (DSO) "for distinguished service in the field".

== See also ==
- List of international rugby union players killed in action during the First World War
