= Cactoblastis ronnai =

Scientific classification
- Domain: Eukaryota
- Kingdom: Animalia
- Phylum: Arthropoda
- Class: Insecta
- Order: Lepidoptera
- Family: Pyralidae
- Genus: Cactoblastis
- Species: C. ronnai

Binomial name
- Cactoblastis ronnai (Brèthes, 1920)

Synonyms
- Neopyralis ronnai Brèthes, 1920

Species of moth

Cactoblastis ronnai is a species of snout moth in the genus Cactoblastis. It was described by Juan Brèthes in 1920 and is known from Brazil.
