= Horace Alexander =

English author and ornithologist (1889–1989)

- Alexander (left), c. 1970
- Born: 18 April 1889; Croydon, England
- Died: 30 September 1989 (aged 100); Pennsylvania, United States
- Occupations: Pacifist; ornithologist
- Writing career
- Genre: Non-fiction
- Subjects: Ornithology; Quakerism; Gandhi; India

Horace Gundry Alexander (18 April 1889 – 30 September 1989) was an English Quaker teacher, writer, pacifist and ornithologist. He was the youngest of four sons of Joseph Gundry Alexander (1848–1918), two other sons being the ornithologists Wilfred Backhouse Alexander and Christopher James Alexander (1887–1917). He was a friend of Mahatma Gandhi.

== Life and work ==
Horace Gundry Alexander was born on 18 April 1889 in Croydon, Surrey. His father, Joseph Gundry Alexander (1848–1918), was an eminent lawyer, who had worked to suppress the opium trade between India and China. His mother was Josephine Crosfield Alexander (1847–1917). His early schooling was at Bootham School in York, after which he studied history at King's College, Cambridge and graduated in 1912. When the First World War broke out in 1914, he served as secretary on various anti-war committees. In 1916, as a conscientious objector, he was initially exempted only from combatant military service, but after two levels of appeal he was exempted on condition of teaching, which he took up via General Service with the Friends' Ambulance Unit, holding posts at Sibford School, Warwick School and Cranbrook School, Kent.

Alexander married Olive Graham (1892–1942) on 20 July 1918 and joined the staff of Woodbrooke, a Quaker college in Birmingham, teaching international relations, especially in relation to the League of Nations, from 1919 to 1944. His wife died in 1942, having used a wheelchair for several years. That year Alexander joined a section of the World War II Friends Ambulance Unit and went to parts of India that were threatened by Japan. In 1958, he married Rebecca Bradbeer (née Biddle, 1901–1991), an American Quaker. After ten years they moved to Pennsylvania, United States, where he spent the remaining twenty years of his life. He was also, for its first ten years, a governor of Leighton Park School, a leading Quaker school in England. He died of a gastrointestinal illness at Crosslands, a Quaker retirement community in Kennett Square, Pennsylvania.

== Ornithology ==
Alexander was a lifelong, dedicated and gifted birdwatcher, keenly involved in the 20th-century movements for the protection and observation of birds. He and two of his older brothers, Wilfred and Christopher, he took a keen interest in nature. Growing up in a Quaker home devoid of any other forms of entertainment, his interest in birds began at the age of eight, when his older brother Gilbert gave him a book on natural history. In his autobiography he traced the beginnings of this interest in birds to 8.45 am on 25 March 1897, when an uncle pointed out a singing chiffchaff in their garden. It was not until he was 20 that he obtained his first pair of binoculars. He was one of a small group of amateur birdwatchers who developed skills and set new standards for combining the pleasures of birdwatching with the satisfaction of contributing to ornithological science. He made many significant observations, mainly in Britain, but also in India and the United States.

Alexander spent most of his time in India and became interested in its birds in 1927. Ornithology at that time was not popular among Indians in India, and when Horace informed Gandhi of an expedition, Gandhi commented, "That is a good hobby, provided you don't shoot them." Horace demonstrated the use of binoculars as an acceptable alternative to the gun and carried them at most times. Horace Alexander joined Sidney Dillon Ripley on an expedition to the Naga Hills in 1950. Ripley named a subspecies of the aberrant bush warbler after Alexander, although this is no longer recognised. In the same year he founded the Delhi Birdwatching Society, along with Lt. Gen. Harold Williams. One early member of the organisation was the young Indira Gandhi, and the group encouraged Indian ornithologists such as Usha Ganguli. Many of his notes were mislaid when one of his suitcases was lost in India in 1946. Through his influence on Jawaharlal Nehru, he was instrumental in the designation of the Sultanpur Bird Sanctuary near Delhi.

Alexander was also a founder member, in 1929, of the West Midland Bird Club (then the Birmingham Bird Club), and its president, during his long residence in Birmingham, England.

== Mohandas Gandhi ==
Alexander's father-in-law, John William Graham, believed that Gandhi was a subversive and that the Indians were unprepared for self-government. At the Quaker yearly meeting in 1930 Rabindranath Tagore attacked colonial rule in India. The Quakers were disturbed by the address and John Graham was particularly outraged. Afterwards it was agreed that a representative would be sent to India to attempt a reconciliation between the Viceroy, Lord Irwin, and Gandhi. This task was assigned to Horace Alexander, who first met Gandhi in March 1928. He made it possible for Gandhi to attend the 1931 round-table conference in London. After the conference he founded the India Conciliation Group along with Agatha Harrison and Carl Heath. Becoming a close friend of Gandhi (who, in 1942, described Alexander as "one of the best English friends India has"), he wrote extensively about Gandhi's philosophy. In 1947 he attempted to intervene to control the violence between Muslims and Hindus and was beside Gandhi in Calcutta on 15 August 1947.

He was consulted by Richard Attenborough in the making of the 1982 film Gandhi. However, he felt that the scripts did not do justice to the people around Gandhi.

In 1984 he was awarded the Padma Bhushan medal, the highest honour given to a non-Indian civilian.

== Radio appearances ==
Alexander made several appearances as a presenter on BBC Radio:

- 27 April 1933: Adventures in Bird Watching, BBC Regional Programme Midland
- 14 June 1948: Personalities and Possibilities in Kashmir, Third Programme
- He also appeared as a guest in the 1950s and 1960s on several programmes about Gandhi.

== Publications ==
The books and articles written by Horace Alexander include:

- Joseph Gundry Alexander. 2 December 2023.
- Justice Among Nations. Leonard & Virginia Woolf At The Hogarth Press. 1927.
- The Indian Ferment. 1929.
- India Since Cripps. Penguin. 1944.
- New Citizens of India. 1951.
- Consider India: An Essay in Values. 1961.
- Gandhi Through Western Eyes. 1969.
  - reissued Gandhi Through Western Eyes. New Society Publishers. 1984. ISBN 978-0-86571-044-3.
- 70 Years of Birdwatching. T & A D Poyser. 1974. ISBN 0-85661-004-6.

=== Ornithological papers ===
- 1929: Some birds seen in the Indian Ocean and the Mediterranean. Ibis, 12 5(1), 41–53.
- 1931: Shearwaters in the Arabian Sea. Ibis, 13 1(3), 579–581.
- 1938: "Bittell Reservoirs, 1938". West Midland Bird Club. Archived from the original on 16 May 2008.
- 1948: "Birds in India". Birmingham Post. 3 March 1943.
- 1948: The status of the Dusky Willow-Warbler Phylloscopus fuscatus (Blyth) in India. JBNHS. 47(4), 736–739.
- 1948: White-winged Wood-Duck Asarcornis scutulatus (Mueller) on the Padma River, East Bengal. JBNHS. 47(4), 749.
- 1949: The birds of Delhi and District. JBNHS. 48(2), 370–372.
- 1949: The Great Crested Grebe Podiceps cristatus (Linn.) in Orissa. JBNHS. 48(2), 367–368.
- 1949: Whitecapped Redstart Chaimarrhornis leucocephalus (Vigors) feeding on berries. JBNHS. 48(4), 806.
- 1950: Field identification of birds. JBNHS. 49(1), 123–124.
- 1950: Kentish Plovers Leucopolius alexandrinus (Linn.) at Bombay. JBNHS. 49(2), 311.
- 1950: Large Grey Babbler attacking metal hub-cap of wheel of car. JBNHS. 49(3), 550.
- 1950: Possible occurrence of the Black Tern Chlidonias niger (L.) near Delhi. JBNHS. 49(1), 120–121.
- 1950: Some notes on the genus Phylloscopus in Kashmir. JBNHS. 49(1), 9–13.
- 1950: with Sir N. F. Frome — Birds of Delhi and District, The Reference List. JBNHS.
- 1951: Some notes on birds in Lahul. JBNHS. 49(4), 608–613.
- 1952: Birds attacking their reflections. JBNHS. 50(3), 674–675.
- 1952: Identifying birds of prey in the field. Bulletin of the British Ornithologists' Club (BBOC) 72, 55–61.
- 1952: Letter to the Editor. Ibis 94(2), 369–370.
- 1952: with Abdulali, H - Ardeidae with red legs. Ibis 94, 363.
- 1953: Rednecked Phalarope near Delhi. JBNHS. 51(2), 507–508.
- 1955: Field notes on some Asian leaf warblers. British Birds. 48, 293–299, 349–356.
- 1957: Bird life of Madhya Pradesh. JBNHS. 54(3), 768–769.
- 1964: Return to Delhi. Newsletter for Birdwatchers. 4(1), 1–3.
- 1969: Some Notes on Asian Leaf-Warblers (Genus Phylloscopus). Private/TRUEXpress, Oxford. 31 pages.
- 1972: On revisiting Delhi. Newsletter for Birdwatchers. 12(9), 1–3.
- 1972: Nest building of the Baya Weaver Bird. Newsletter for Birdwatchers. 12(9):12.
- 1974: What leads to increases in the range of certain birds? Journal of the Bombay Natural History Society (JBNHS). 71(3), 571–576.
