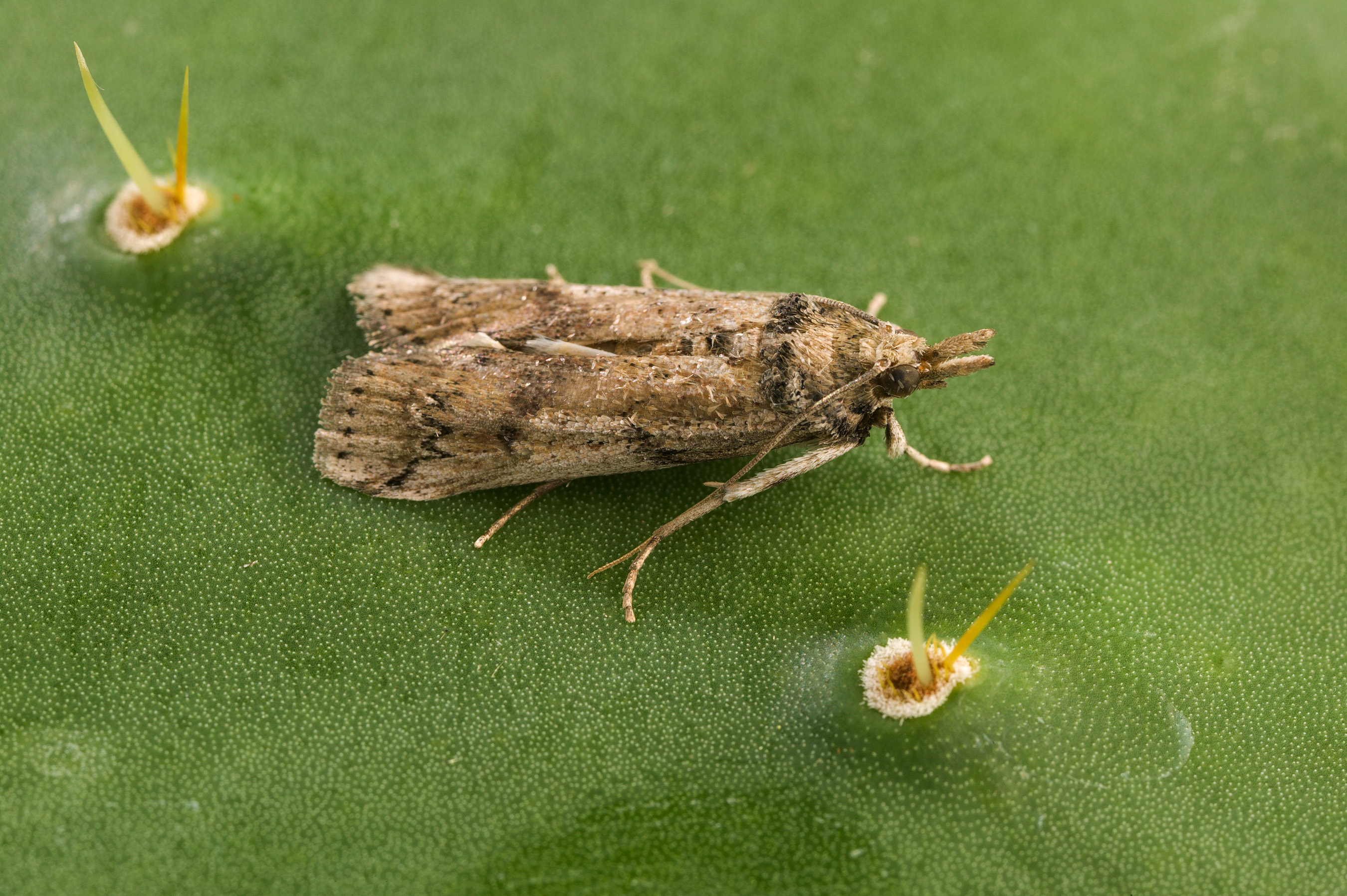
- Cactoblastis cactorum

Scientific classification
- Domain: Eukaryota
- Kingdom: Animalia
- Phylum: Arthropoda
- Class: Insecta
- Order: Lepidoptera
- Family: Pyralidae
- Subfamily: Phycitinae
- Tribe: Phycitini
- Genus: Cactoblastis; Ragonot, 1901

Synonyms
- Neopyralis Brèthes, 1920

= Cactoblastis =

Genus of moths

Cactoblastis is a genus of snout moths. It was described by Émile Louis Ragonot in 1901 and is known from Argentina, Peru, and Brazil.

== Species ==
- Cactoblastis bucyrus Dyar, 1922
- Cactoblastis cactorum (Berg, 1885) – South American cactus moth
- Cactoblastis doddi Heinrich, 1939
- Cactoblastis mundelli Heinrich, 1939
- Cactoblastis ronnai (Brèthes, 1920)
