= Christopher James Alexander =

English ornithologist

Christopher James Alexander (24 March 1887 – 5 October 1917) was an English ornithologist. He was the son of Joseph Gundry Alexander and the brother of ornithologists Wilfred Backhouse Alexander and Horace Gundry Alexander.

== Early life ==
Alexander was born on 24 March 1887 in Croydon, England, and was educated at Bootham School, York and the South Eastern Agricultural College, Wye. He gained a BSc in Agriculture in 1908 from the college and remained there as staff for the next year. In 1909, after devoting some time to mycological work in England, Alexander left for Rome to take up a post as redacteur at the International Institute of Agriculture, where he stayed until 1916.

From an early age, Alexander showed a love of natural history which continued up until his death. Whilst he was at school he kept detailed notes of observations on birds, plants, and insects. He continued these daily notes after he left school and indeed for the rest of his life. He observed the song of birds, the first blossoming of flowers, appearance of certain insects, and appearance, increase, decrease, departure and passage of migrants – until the day of his death.

== Ornithology ==
Alexander made very detailed observations of bird-distribution and migration, first in Kent and other parts of England, and then in Rome. Even at war in Flanders, he still made detailed records; observing the birds throughout autumn and winter and in The Somme in July.

In 1916, Alexander came back to England from Rome so that he could serve in the army. He enlisted as a Private and joined the Buffs (Royal East Kent Regiment) on 29 February 1916 before transferring to The Queen's (Royal West Surrey Regiment) after the Battle of the Somme. During his training he was based mainly in Dover, but in June of that year, he was sent to France. There, fighting at the Somme, Alexander was able to alleviate his grim surroundings somewhat by looking and listening to birds. He was often rewarded by the sight of a green sandpiper in a flooded trench or a great grey shrike on the battlefield

One night in 1917, while on sentry duty, Alexander broke his leg. The injury was assumed to be just a sprain and was not properly treated for more than two weeks. He was then sent back to Britain, and spent his convalescence in Monmouthshire, Wales. After more training until his leg was fully healed, Alexander was sent back to France. He was mortally wounded during the Battle of Broodseinde on 4 October 1917 and died the following day. He is buried in Hooge Crater Cemetery, located on the Ypres Salient in Belgium.

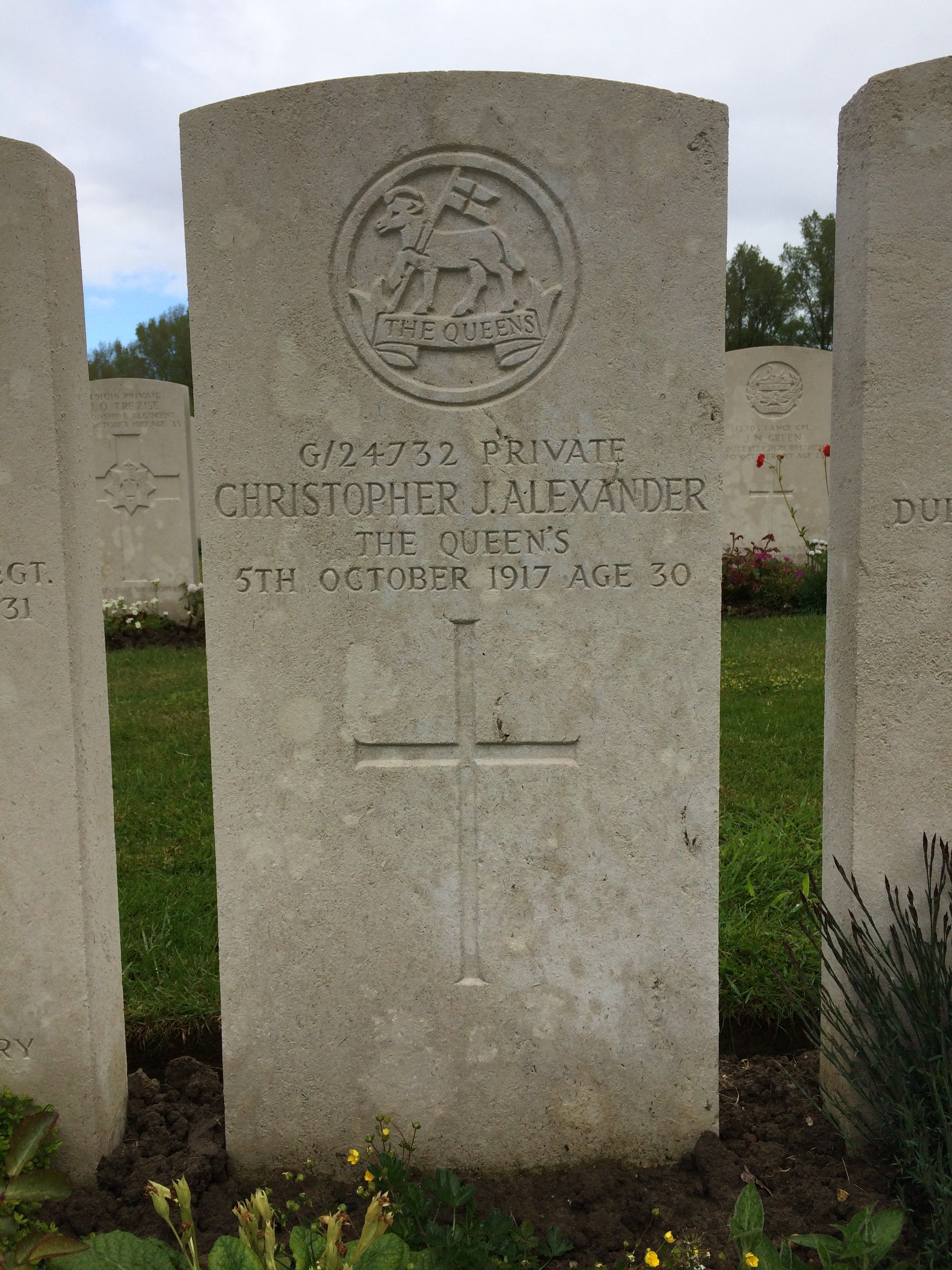
Christopher James Alexander's grave in Hooge Crater Cemetery.

== Character ==
Alexander was a kind, shy, unassuming man, for whom "social intercourse with any but very simple, unassuming, frank people, or to those who shared his interests, was a torment to him." It was typical of him that it was only after he died that his family learnt that in one of the battles in which he took part he had captured a German prisoner and shared his last biscuit and water with him.
