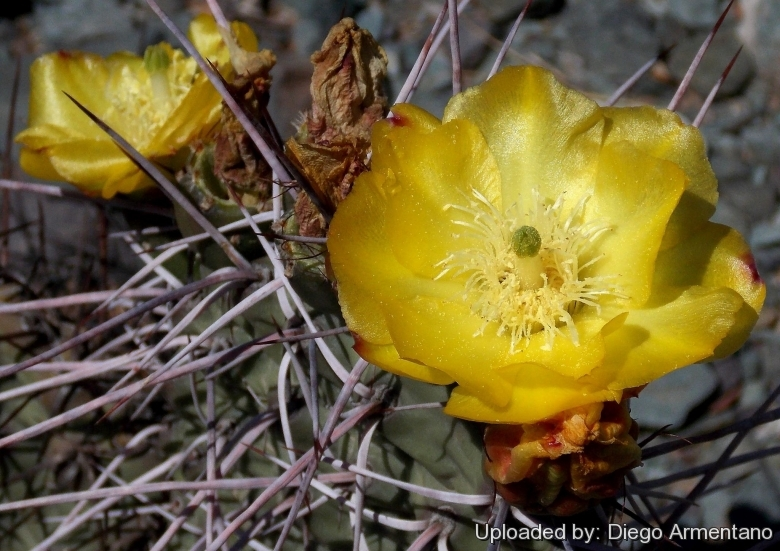
- Opuntia sulphurea, Province of Juyjuy, Argentina, 2325 meters above sea level

Conservation status
- Least Concern (IUCN 3.1)

Scientific classification
- Kingdom: Plantae
- Clade: Tracheophytes
- Clade: Angiosperms
- Clade: Eudicots
- Order: Caryophyllales
- Family: Cactaceae
- Genus: Opuntia
- Species: O. sulphurea

Binomial name
- Opuntia sulphurea G.Don ex Salm-Dyck

= Opuntia sulphurea =

Species of cactus

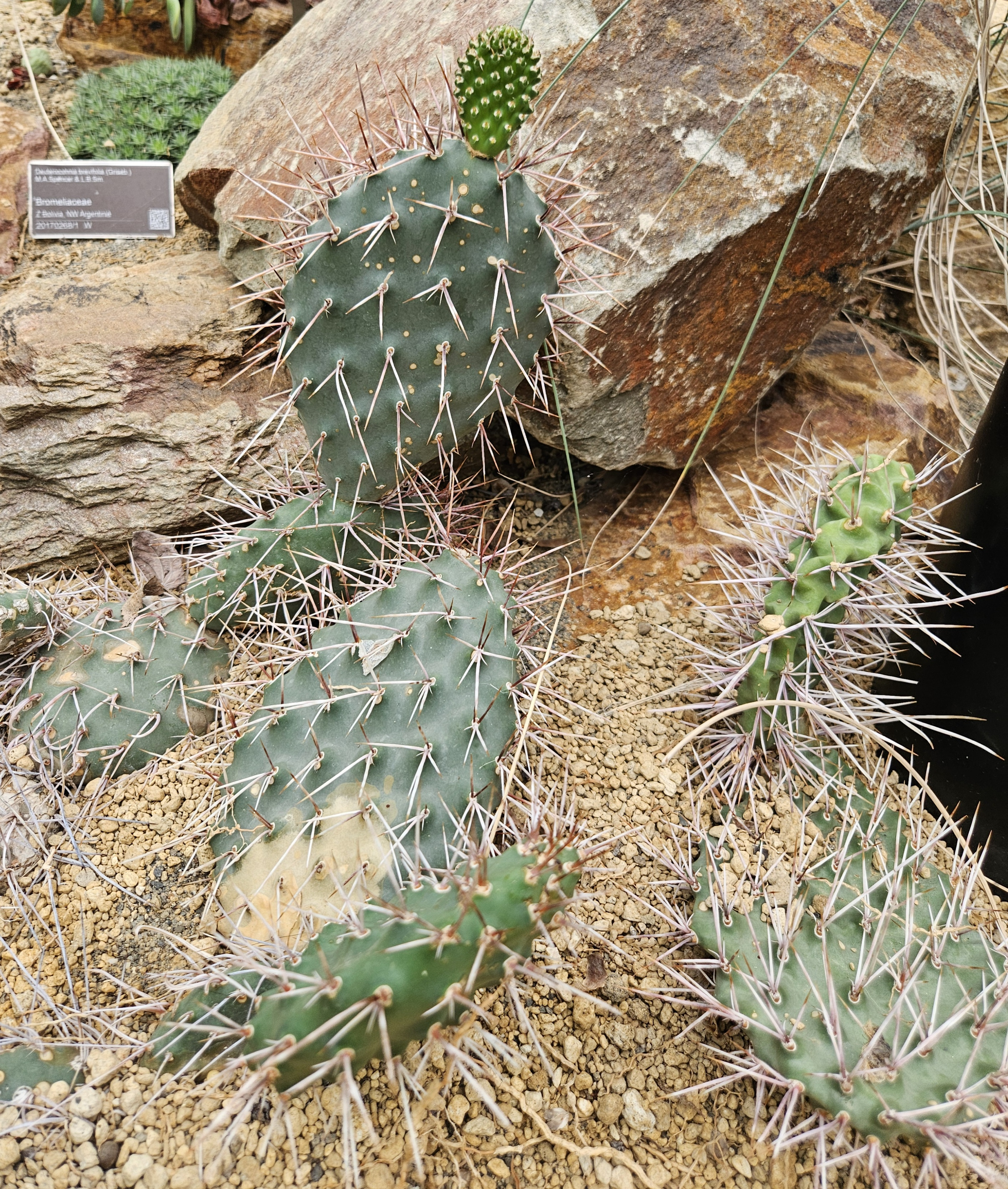
Opuntia sulphurea at Hortus botanicus of Amsterdam

Opuntia sulphurea falls under the Opuntia, or prickly pear, genus within the family Cactaceae named such because of their round shape, green color, and long thick spines. Opuntia sulphurea is the widest spread of the Opuntia that can be found in and around Argentina, occupying mostly arid areas of the region from the plains in the Western portion of Argentina up to much higher altitudes on the Eastern side of the Andes mountain range. As a result of its ability to survive in such a diverse array of environments there are several subspecies of O. sulphurea that are identifiable based on the number of spine per areole, for example. A commonality across the three is a bright yellow flower, often considered to be the color of sulfur, from which the species name is derived. As with several other species of Opuntia, these prickly pears tend to grow in groups, forming clumps that can reach one to two meters in diameter, but while other species within the genus grow upwards as well O. sulphurea tend to stay low to the ground. As a result of its tendency to grow in dry, arid, and rocky areas this cactus has evolved to be very resilient, not even suffering from the effects of agriculture, i.e. cattle grazing, on lower altitude subpopulations.

Other common names for the species in Spanish include "penca, penquilla, penca chica", "penca" referring to the "main rib" of a plant.

== Distribution ==
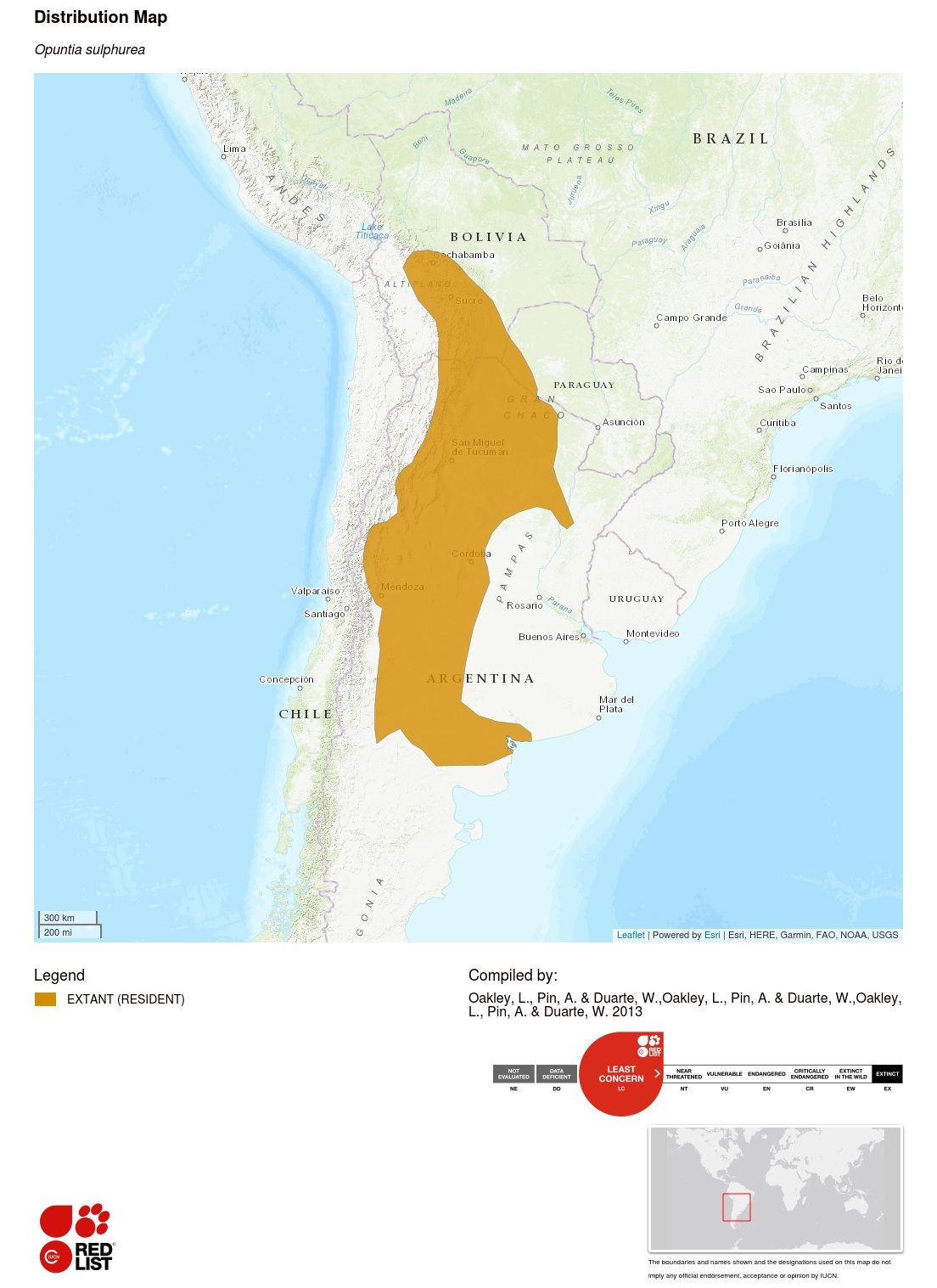
Map of the range of distribution of Opuntia sulphurea

Found mostly in, and thought to originate from, the northwestern region of Argentina, from the Mendoza province up to Jujuy in the North and the Buenos Aires province to the West, Opuntia sulphurea can also be seen in parts of Paraguay and Bolivia, Chile, Western Brazil as well as a specific population that is notably naturalised "in localised areas of southern Queensland (Australia)". This species can inhabit locations at a wide range of altitudes, from areas at sea level to heights of 3,500meters. In a paper from Kiesling and Ferrari about species of cacti from Argentina they describe variants in the color of the fruit of Opuntia sulphurea based on their geographic location within its range. They refer to three varieties: the sulphurea variant which bears the signature yellow fruit, seen in ranging from the province of Mendoza to the province of Catamarca, the hildemannii which grows near the southern border of Bolivia and produces a red fruit, and the pampeana variant, named after the area of central Argentina known as the Pampas. These variants, however, have not been listed as official subspecies.

== Habitat and ecology ==
This particular species of prickly pear cactus tends to thrive in a diverse number of environments but tends to favor arid, cool regions typically growing in rocky soils on hillsides at and above sea level, though it can also prosper in clay-filled soils as well. Additionally, Opuntia sulphurea prefers nitrogen-rich soils and as a result, has a tendency to grow efficiently in areas that have been subject to overgrazing. In fact, according to a study done in Mendoza, Argentina the presence of this cactus can indicate that overgrazing has occurred because within this study, conducted by Eduardo Méndez, "the population of O. sulphurea increased from 1.3 plants/100 m2 in the lightly grazed area to 15.9 plants/100 m2 in the overgrazed area". Méndez hypothesized that the typical form of agamic propagation, a type of asexual reproduction, performed by O. sulphurea via their cladode, the elliptical stem of the plant, was actually facilitated by the cattle grazing in the area because of the species' preference for eutrophic areas. Given its ability to survive in a multitude of environments as well as thrive off in areas where other plants might struggle O. sulphurea is in no danger of extinction and according to the IUCN Red List their population is in the category of least concern, they can act as an invasive species.

== Morphology ==
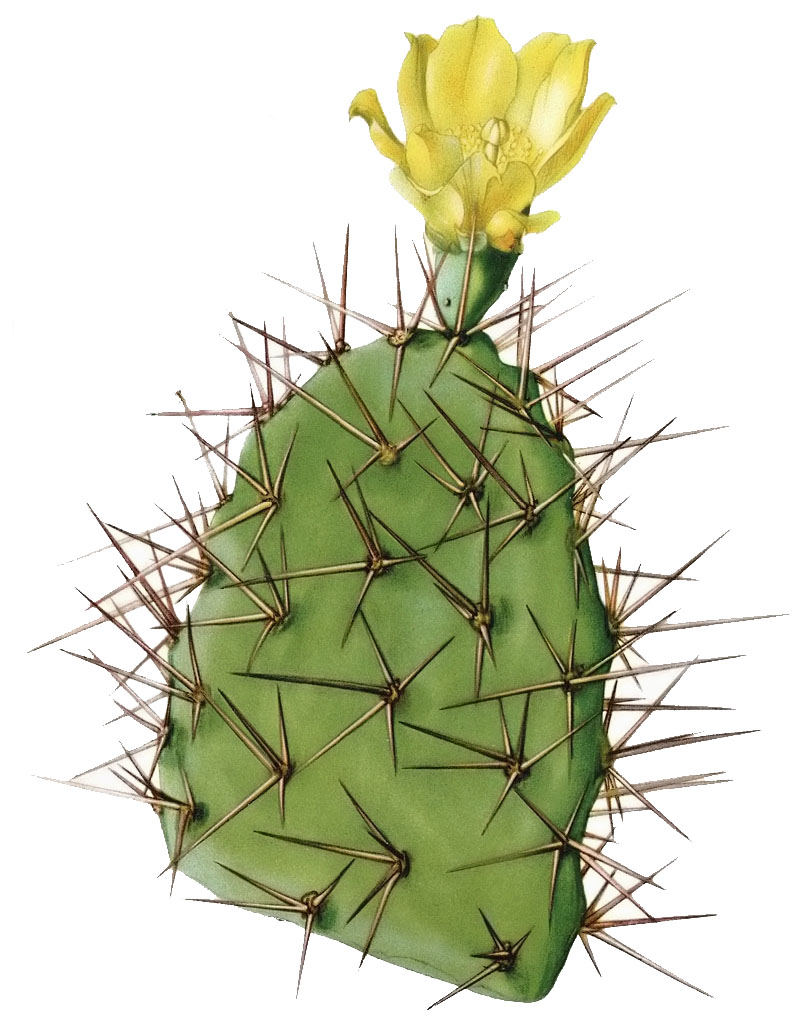
Opuntia sulphurea The Cactaceae

Opuntia sulphurea is distinct from many species of cacti, even within its own genus because of its tendency to stay low to the ground and grow wider rather than taller, forming large groups of clumps that reach no higher than 40 cm off the ground. It is composed of many "elliptic to ovoid pads measuring 15 to 20 cm long and 10 to 13cm wide" that are each singular organisms, remaining in a tight group. The areoles of the shrub exhibit a "corrugated aspect" as a result of the tuberculate nature of the plant's joints and average an area of 4 X 3 mm. Most areoles contain spines, which can differ in color from pink, should the spine be young, to a gray or even dark color spine, as the areole and spine mature. These spines are thick, stiff, and possess a needle-like shape, they can grow anywhere between 3–10 cm long and often twist as they mature. The sulphurea also grows a bright yellow flower that typically reaches about 4 cm in length and is described as having exterior, intermediate and interior tepals as well as fruits that vary between a yellowish and reddish color.

== Common uses ==
There are not any current common uses for this species of cactus, however, due to its ability to store water, high amounts of protein, and large quantities of stored fatty acids, stemming from their significant linolenic acid content in their cladodes, they could be used as a food source in the future. While this is already the case among local rural communities should its use become more popular it is likely that this species will have a significant economic impact because of its resilient and widespread nature.
