= Hollebeke Mountain =

Mountain in the country of Canada

- Location within Alberta Location within British Columbia Location within Canada

Highest point
- Elevation: 2,407 m (7,897 ft)
- Prominence: 342 m (1,122 ft)
- Coordinates: 49°22′39″N 114°34′03″W

Geography
- Country: Canada
- Provinces: Alberta and British Columbia
- Topo map: NTS 82G7 Flathead Ridge

Hollebeke Mountain is located on the border of Alberta and British Columbia on the Continental Divide. It was named in 1917 after Hollebeke, a village in Belgium.

== See also ==
- List of peaks on the Alberta–British Columbia border
- List of mountains of Alberta
- Mountains of British Columbia
