= Hollebeke =

Village in West Flanders, Belgium

Coordinates: 50°48′19″N 2°56′17″E

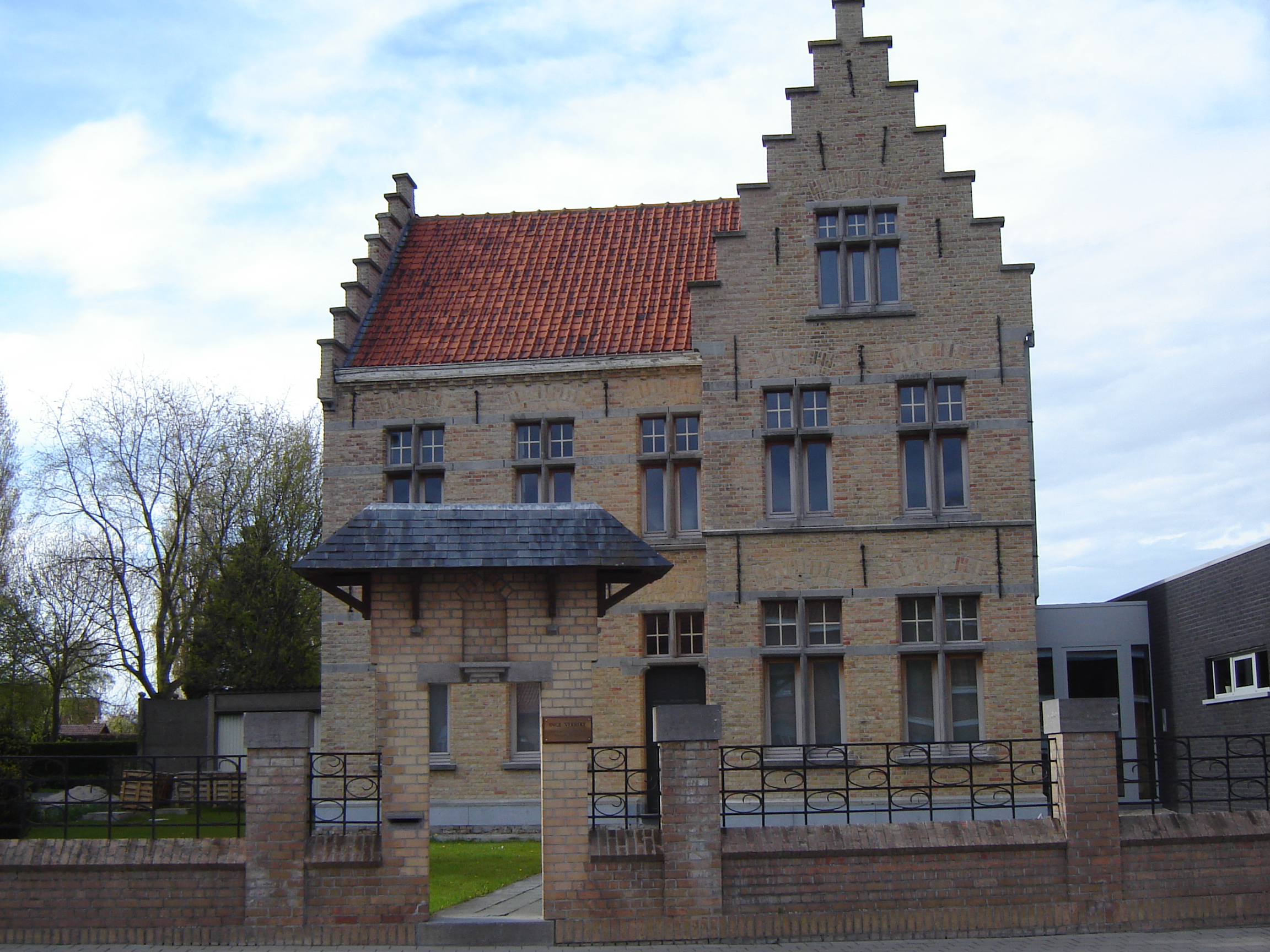
Rectory in Hollebeke, Ypres, West Flanders, Belgium

Hollebeke is a Flemish village in the Belgian province of West Flanders, now part of Ypres.

== History ==
In World War I, it was the site of Allied heroism (like other neighbouring parts of Ypres, such as Klein Zillebeke) that won Khudadad Khan the first Victoria Cross ever awarded to a native South Asian.

In 1970 it was incorporated in Zillebeke, which in turn merged with the city of Ieper (Ypres, at five miles' distance) in 1976.

== Homonyms ==
To commemorate the Canadian and Australian troops fighting at Hollebeke, in 1917 the 2,221-metre-high (7,287 ft) Hollebeke Mountain (49° 23' 30" North, 114° 34' 10" West), on the continental divide at the head of Pincher Creek; southeast buttress of North Kootenay Pass. Park, bordering Alberta and British Columbia, was named after the village. Major headwaters are Oldman River and Flathead River. It also gave its name to the families Hollebeke and Van Hollebeke (van is Dutch for 'of', in surnames often meaning 'from').

== Sources and references ==
- Belgian Civic heraldry includes coat of arms
- "Hollebeke Mountain". cdnrockiesdatabases.ca.
