= Archie Blake =

Archie Blake may refer to:

- Archie Blake: a Sea-side Story, a novel by Elizabeth Eiloart
- Archie Blake (mathematician) (1906–1971), American mathematician, discoverer of the Blake canonical form
