= 16th (Service) Battalion, Rifle Brigade (St Pancras) =

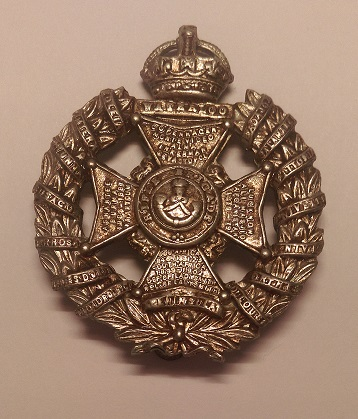
- Cap badge of the Rifle Brigade
- Active: 2 April 1915–2 June 1919
- Allegiance: United Kingdom
- Branch: New Army
- Role: Infantry
- Size: One Battalion
- Part of: 39th Division
- Garrison/HQ: St Pancras, London
- Patron: St Pancras Parliamentary Recruiting Committee
- Engagements: Battle of the Somme; Battle of the Ancre; Third Battle of Ypres; German spring offensive Battle of the Lys

The 16th (Service) Battalion, Rifle Brigade (St Pancras) (16th RB) was an infantry unit recruited in St Pancras, London, as part of 'Kitchener's Army' in World War I. It served on the Western Front, including the battles of the Somme and the Ancre, the Ypres offensive and the German spring offensives. After its losses the battalion was reduced to a training cadre for the rest of the war, helping to prepare newly-arrived US troops and others for Trench warfare. It was disbanded in 1919.

== Recruitment and training ==
Alfred Leete's recruitment poster for Kitchener's Army.

On 6 August 1914, less than 48 hours after Britain's declaration of war, Parliament sanctioned an increase of 500,000 men for the Regular British Army. The newly-appointed Secretary of State for War, Earl Kitchener of Khartoum, issued his famous call to arms: 'Your King and Country Need You', urging the first 100,000 volunteers to come forward. Men flooded into the recruiting offices and the 'first hundred thousand' were enlisted within days. This group of six divisions with supporting arms became known as Kitchener's First New Army, or 'K1'. K2, K3 and K4 followed shortly afterwards.

But the flood of volunteers overwhelmed the ability of the Army to absorb them, and the K5 units were largely raised by local initiative rather than at regimental depots, often from men from particular localities or backgrounds who wished to serve together: these were known as 'Pals battalions'. The 'Pals' phenomenon quickly spread across the country, as local recruiting committees offered complete units to the War Office (WO). Encouraged by this response, in February 1915 Kitchener approached the 28 Metropolitan Borough Councils in the County of London, and the 'Great Metropolitan Recruiting Campaign' went ahead, with each mayor asked to raise a unit of local men. Even though the Borough of St Pancras already supported the 19th Battalion, London Regiment (St Pancras) of the Territorial Force, which had expanded to three battalions, the St Pancras Parliamentary Recruiting Committee agreed to raise a Kitchener battalion as well. This was authorised on 2 April 1915 as the 16th (Service) Battalion, Rifle Brigade (St Pancras) (16th RB).

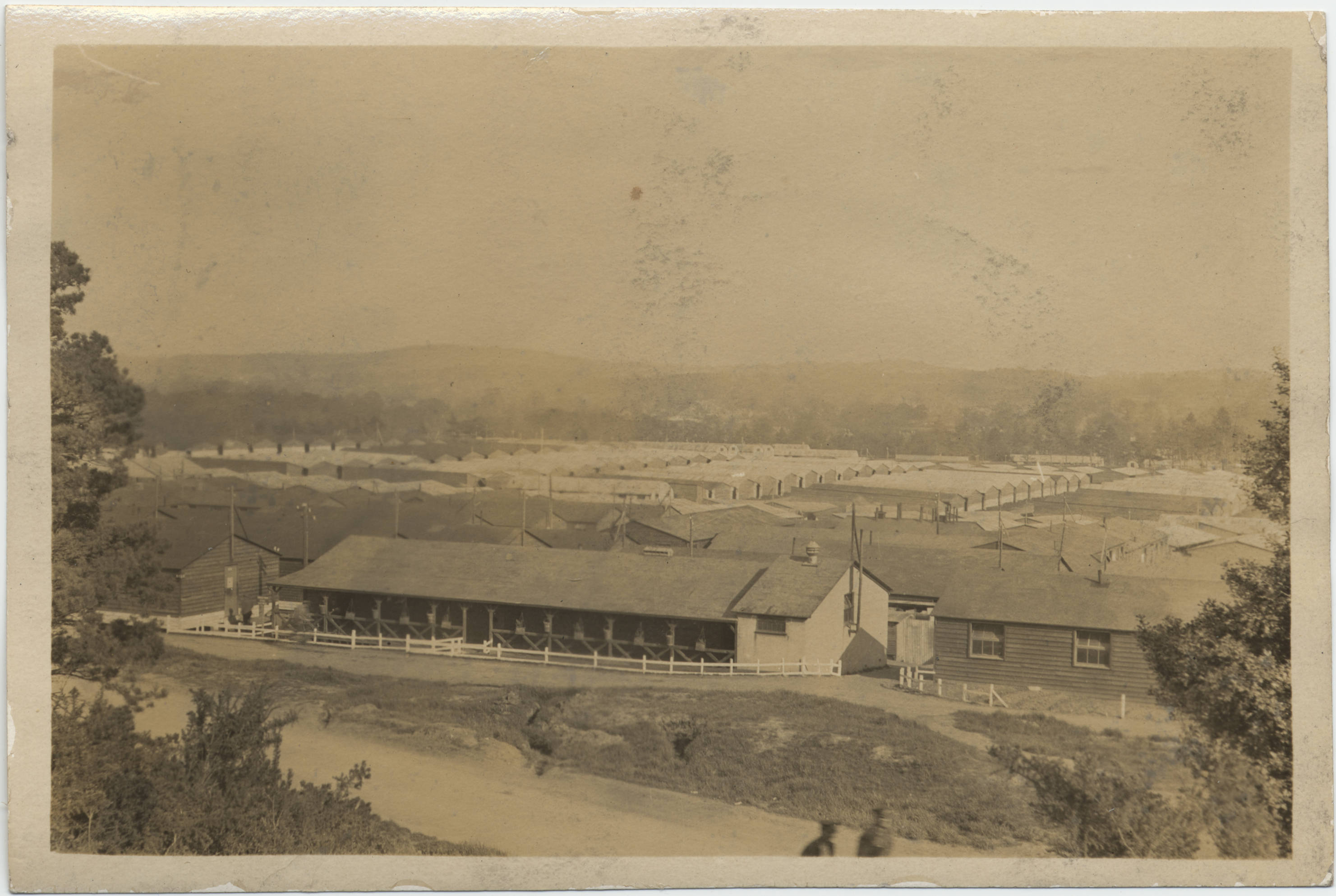
Witley Camp, where 16th Rifle Brigade trained.

16th RB formally became part of 117th Brigade when that was formed on 15 July 1915 in 39th Division. It was brigaded with the 16th (Chatsworth Rifles) and 17th (Welbeck Rangers) Service Battalions of the Sherwood Foresters (SF) and the 17th (Service) Battalion, King's Royal Rifle Corps (British Empire League) (17th KRRC). On 16 August the battalion was the first infantry unit to arrive at Hursley Park, near Winchester, where the division was to form. On 29 September 117th Bde moved to Marlborough Lines at Aldershot, and then in November to Witley Camp in Surrey. Apart from a brief spell back at Aldershot in January 1916 to carry out its musketry course with newly-issued rifles, 16th RB remained at Witley for the rest of its training.

Mobilisation orders were received during February for 39th Division to join the British Expeditionary Force (BEF) on the Western Front , but entrainment for the embarkation ports was repeatedly postponed. Eventually, 16th RB (34 officers and 969 other ranks (ORs) under Lieutenant-Colonel Harry Darell) boarded trains at Milford on 7 March bound for Southampton Docks. There it embarked on HM Transport Viper, with the transport loaded aboard HMT Maidan. It disembarked at Le Havre next morning.

=== 17th (Reserve) Battalion ===
The depot companies of 16th RB were formed into 17th (Reserve) Battalion, Rifle Brigade, on 15 October 1915 at West Minster, Kent. By January 1916 it was part of 26th Reserve Brigade at Banbury, Oxfordshire, which moved to Wimbledon Common in April. On 1 September 1916 the Training Reserve was established following the introduction of conscription, and 17th (R) Bn RB became 112th Training Reserve Battalion, though the training staff retained their KRRC badges. The brigade continued to provide reinforcement drafts for the KRRC and the Rifle Brigade. The battalion was disbanded at Wimbledon on 2 March 1918.

== Service ==
39th Division's formation sign.

By 11 March 39th Division had concentrated round Blaringhem in First Army area, with 16th RB in 117th Bde's concentration area at Steenbecque. 117th Brigade was attached to the experienced 25th Brigade of 8th Division for its introduction to Trench warfare, 16th RB going to Sailly-sur-la-Lys, where A and B Companies were attached to the 2nd RB and then C and D Companies went to 1st Royal Irish Rifles. Here the battalion suffered its first few casualties. On completion of this attachment on 27 March the battalion marched to billets at Estaires, where 117th Bde was attached to 98th Bde of 33rd Division for further trench instruction. This time the companies took over their own sections of trench in the Annequin North sector, A and C with 1st Middlesex Regiment, B and D with 4th King's Regiment. Finally, on 2 April the whole of 16th RB took over 1st Middlesex's sector in 'Harley Street' trench. By mid-April 39th Division had relieved 33rd Division in the Givenchy–Festubert sector.

The battalion began a routine of spells in the line interspersed with spells in billets at La Pannerie, when working parties were constantly required. There was a trickle of casualties both in the line and among working parties from shellfire and rifle grenade exchanges with the enemy. 16th RB usually alternated with 17th SF. In May there was increased activity on the Givenchy–Festubert front and 16th RB's casualties amounted to 40 in the month. After a spell in divisional reserve the battalion took over at Festubert village in June. While the BEF prepared for that summer's 'Big Push (the Battle of the Somme) further south, 39th Division kept up a series of diversionary trench raids. 16th RB was called upon to carry out a large one on the night of 4/5 July, directed against a small salient of enemy trench known as the 'Pope's Nose'. Lieutenant-Col Darell detailed eight separate parties to this raid, totalling 10 officers and 270 ORs under the second-in-command, Major H.C. Bridges. The barbed wire in front of the enemy trenches was cut two nights before the raid, and on the night of the raid the artillery began a diversionary bombardment on 'Orchard Trench' before laying a Box barrage to seal off the 'Pope's Nose' at 00.35. One of the raiding parties was tasked with laying three footbridges over a water-filled ditch; the next ditch was known to be bridged. However, the Germans had anticipated the raid: the gaps in the wire were filled by loose coils of barbed wire hidden in the long grass, and when the raiders reached this they were met by a shower of grenades. They did get into the German front trench in a disjointed fight with bombs and bayonets ('swords' in Rifle parlance), but three officers had been killed, four wounded and two were missing, as was the Royal Engineers (RE) officer in charge of the demolition party. At least 100 of the men were already out of action. It had been intended to penetrate to the German second line, but this had to be abandoned; the RE party blew up a machine gun emplacement and a pumping installation, and Maj Bridges, the only remaining officer, withdrew the men under cover of the artillery barrage. Casualties were probably heavier than those inflicted on the enemy.

=== Somme ===
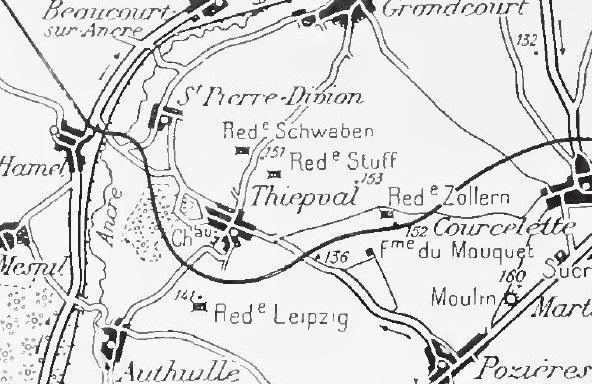
The Ancre Heights in 1916.

The Somme Offensive had been launched on 1 July, and on 11 August 39th Division was ordered to march south to join in. 16th RB reached Vauchelles-lès-Authie, near Doullens, on 25 August. From 29 August the battalion stood by at 'Y' Camp at Bertrancourt, awaiting orders from Reserve Army to go up to the front. Reserve Army began a series of minor operations along the River Ancre in early September. On 3 September 39th Division was ordered to secure a few hundred yards of high ground north-west of St Pierre-Divion, to cover the flank of 49th (West Riding) Division advancing up the river valley. The left attack was made by 117th Bde, with 16th RB (right) and 17th SF (left) leading, 17th KRRC in support. All three battalions were much understrength, not having replaced the losses of recent months. The first wave of 16th RB consisted of 3 platoons of B Company and 1 of C Company, the second of 3 platoons of A Company and 2 of C, and the third wave of 3 platoons of D Company and the HQ Lewis guns, with an RE section, a Vickers gun section from 117th Machine Gun Company, and two mortar teams from 117th Light Trench Mortar Battery. The three waves had the first, second and third German trench lines as their respective objectives. The first two waves were to 'jump off' from 'Gordon Trench', their carrying parties from 'Bedford Street', and the third wave would advance over the top from 'Roberts Trench'. Darell ordered that 'magazines should be loaded but all work to be done with the sword', the men were to keep their 'nose right under the barrage' and to 'work by time, don't wait for troops on right or left'. Zero was at 05.10 and the waves set off behind the Creeping barrage in good order. Unfortunately, the barrage had little effect on the enemy, and as soon as it lifted off the first line they manned the parapet and threw grenades as the first wave attackers closed in. The first wave entered the enemy trenches at the extreme right and left and in the centre, but defenders held on in between. Some of the second wave got over and even got into the second line of trenches but were met by intense machine gun and shell fire. The third wave got no further than the German front line. By 05.40 the attack had clearly failed, most of the surviving attackers retired to their own trenches, leaving a couple of small parties holding out in the German trenches. Although the third wave had shiny metal discs on their backs, the smoke and mist made observation impossible, and runners had great difficulty making their way back across the shell-swept No man's land. Hearing the enemy machine gun fire die down, Darell thought that the attack had succeeded, but the bad news reached him at 06.35 and he joined his men in Gordon Trench. After reorganisation, he launched a second attack at 11.05 with 3 officers and about 100 men, about 30 of whom reached the enemy trench and bombed dugouts before being ejected. Apart from one officer's party that had linked up with the neighbouring 14th Hampshire Regiment (116th Bde) the remaining small parties were bombed out of the German front trench. None of those who had reached the second line got back. 49th (WR) Division's attack had also failed, so 39th Division called off any further attacks.16th RB was relieved that evening and returned to 'X' Camp at Bertrancourt. It had lost 7 officers and 30 ORs killed, 7 officers and 235 ORs wounded, 2 officers and 176 ORs missing.

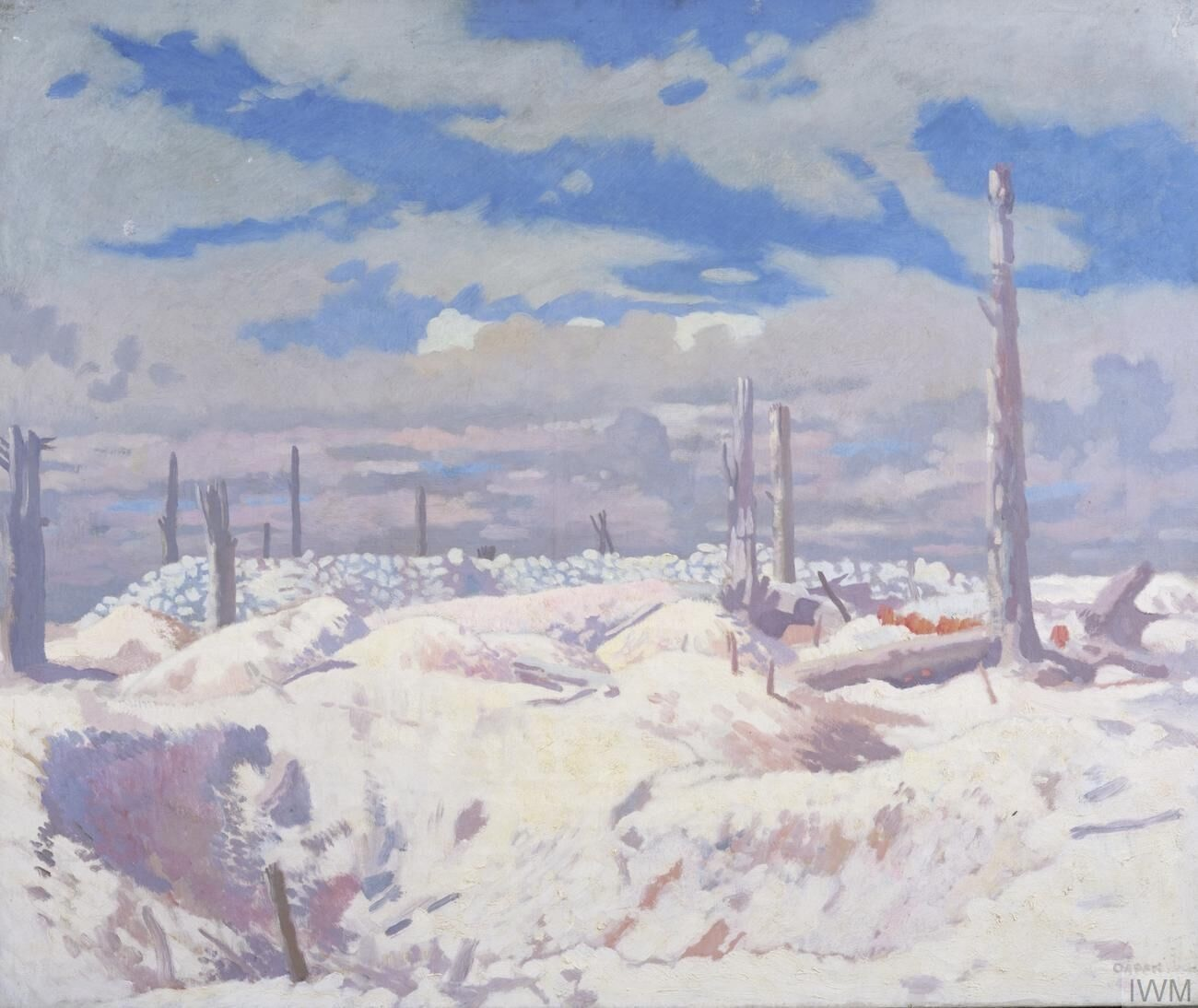
Schwaben Redoubt by William Orpen.

On 6 September 16th RB marched to Mailly-Maillet where it went into Brigade Reserve. Next day it was joined by a reinforcement draft of 419 ORs, all 'Derby Scheme' recruits who had just arrived from 14th (Reserve) Bn, Rifle Brigade, in England; another 64-strong draft and a few officers arrived over following days. The battalion immediately set about training these men. It went back into the front line at 'Y Ravine' on 11 September, providing a chain of bombing parties to throw 'P Bombs' (phosphorus grenades) to create a smokescreen in No man's land to cooperate with the Battle of Flers-Courcelette on 15 September. On 19 September it moved into the front line trenches in the Serre sector for the rest of the month, then on 30 September it went to billets in Courcelles-au-Bois. 39th Division entered the Battle of the Ancre Heights on 5 October and 16th RB took over some recently-captured German trenches near the 'Schwaben Redoubt'. It suffered a number of casualties while holding these trenches until relieved on 9 October, when it was marched to some dugouts at Martinsart. On 14 October the battalion was in support when 118th Bde completed the Capture of Schwaben Redoubt, after which two companies held Thiepval. It then occupied dugouts at 'North & South Bluffs' while providing working parties, which suffered numerous casualties.

16th RB moved to the Ancre Centre Section near St Pierre Divion on 20 October, where 117th Bde was to carry out a subsidiary attack next day as the rest of 39th Division attempted to capture 'Stuff Trench'. A company from 17th SF supported by one from 16th RB attacked three points south of the river. The one on the left (Point 16) was taken and a trench block established, but the rest of the trench had been obliterated by shellfire. The other party could not advance from the right post (Point 47) to its final objective at a trench junction (Point 38), so it established a block at Point 47 but was unable to hold it. Meanwhile 116th Bde had successfully completed the capture of Stuff Trench. 16th RB continued alternating between the Ancre valley and Martinsart for the rest of the month. Lieutenant-Col Darell (who had recently been awarded the Distinguished Service Order (DSO)) was taken to hospital on 1 November and the Brigade major of 117th Bde, Captain D.G. Maxwell (Gordon Highlanders) took temporary command of the battalion. In November 16th RB provided the garrison of the Schwaben Redoubt, then went into brigade support in Thiepval village, and afterwards alternated between Thiepval and Martinsart. Reserve Army (now Fifth Army) launched a new offensive (the Battle of the Ancre) on 13 November. 16th RB was again in brigade reserve at Thiepval when 39th Division attacked from the Schwaben and Stuff Trench and finally captured St Pierre-Divion with so little trouble that 16th RB was not called upon. The division was relieved on 14 November and began a journey north by road and rail to join Second Army, where 16th RB went into billets in Bollezeele for rest and training. Major E.N. Snepp (Norfolk Regiment) took over command of the battalion on 20 November and a draft of 155 ORs arrived on 28 November.

=== Winter 1916–17 ===
On 11 December 16th RB entrained for Poperinge behind the Ypres Salient and two days later it went into brigade support in 'Canal Trench'. The usual trench routine was resumed, alternating with other battalions of the brigade in the front and support trenches, or providing working parties when out of the line. Apart from a short move to the Wieltje sector in January, this routine continued for several months. On 2 February a party about 330 strong began training under Lt-Col Snepp for a large raid to be carried out by A and C Companies from 16th RB and two (later one) from 11th Royal Sussex Regiment (1st South Down) of 116th Bde. Meanwhile the remaining parts of the two battalions (as '11th/16th Sussex Riflemen') held the line under the command of the second-in-command of 16th RB, Maj W.J. King. This raid (reduced to 4 officers, 159 ORs and 7 Sappers from 225th Field Company RE) was finally launched at 00.25 on 14 February. The objective was 'The Mound' a fortified salient projecting forward from the German front line. Jumping-off tapes had been laid in No man's land earlier in the night and the men passed through gaps in their own wire and silently lay down on these tapes. A password was issued for the operation: to the challenge 'Saint?', the correct reply was 'Pancras'. The raid was supported by field artillery, trench mortar and machine gun barrages. These began four minutes before Zero, the artillery landing their shells 50 yards (46 m) short of the German trenches, and then creeping forward by short lifts across the German front and support trenches to the reserve line, where it settled at Zero plus 4 minutes as a box barrage to seal off the assault area. The raiders, in three groups each of two waves, the second intended to 'mop up' and search enemy dugouts, advanced on time but were met by heavy rifle fire and a retaliatory barrage: the enemy had been alerted by the artillery firing to cut the wire over preceding days and earlier that evening. Only small parties of the flanking groups got through the inadequately-cut wire and into the enemy trench, where they engaged in bombing fights with the defenders. The centre group got into the Mound without much difficulty, but then got split up and did not achieve much. All the survivors withdrew when the blue recall rockets were sent up 25 minutes after Zero. The casualties were heavy: 2 officers and 8 ORs killed, 2 officers and 42 ORs wounded, and 7 ORs missing. Afterwards 16th RB were billeted in Ypres, first at the Convent, later at the infantry barracks.

The battalion spent March alternating between trenches at Zillebeke, training at 'Toronto Camp', and providing working parties. In April 39th Division was taken out of the line for training, 16th RB arriving by train on 14 April at Millain, near Saint-Omer where the battalion's platoons began learning the new offensive tactics. At the end of the month it returned to Poperinge and was engaged in training and railway construction until mid-May. It then went into the line at the Hill Top sector, where 117th Bde dug and wired new trenches to link up with Wieltje in preparation for the coming Ypres Offensive. On 6 June Lt-Col H.C. Bridges returned to the battalion having been acting commander of 17th KRRC; he took over 16th RB while Lt-Col Snepp went to command 11th Sussex. 16th RB spent the second half of June in the line at 'Lancashire Farm', suffering a daily toll of casualties from the heavy shellfire. It was relieved on 30 June and next day went by rail to the Serques area where it underwent special training over model trenches for the forthcoming offensive. Emphasis was given to methods for overcoming the new concrete 'pillboxes' the Germans were constructing. During the month Lt-Col Bridges was sent to hospital so Maj King took over until Lt-Col the Hon Edward Coke arrived from 2nd Rifle Brigade to assume command of 16th RB on 20 July. The battalion began its return to the line on 21 July and by 29 July was in dugouts on the east canal bank north of Ypres and opposite La Brique and St Jean.

=== Ypres ===
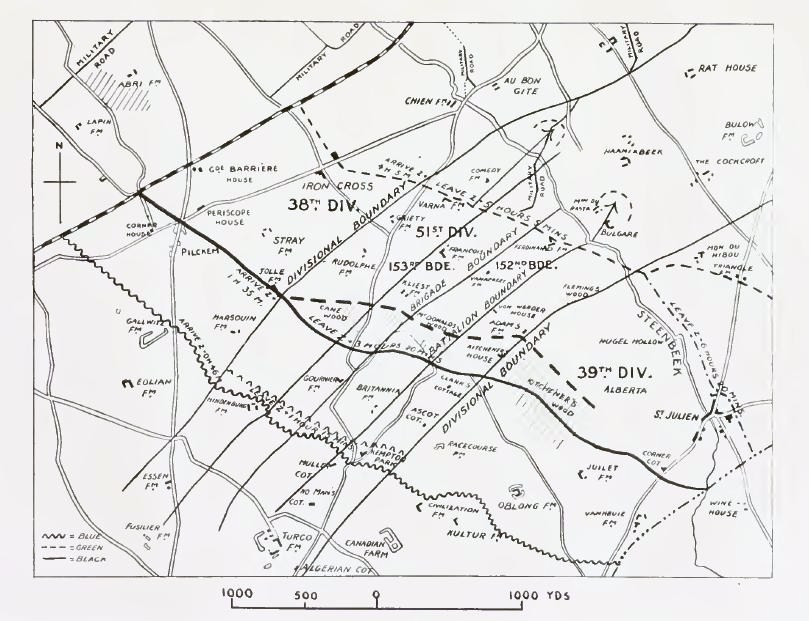
The northern part of the Battle of Pilckem Ridge, 31 July 1917.

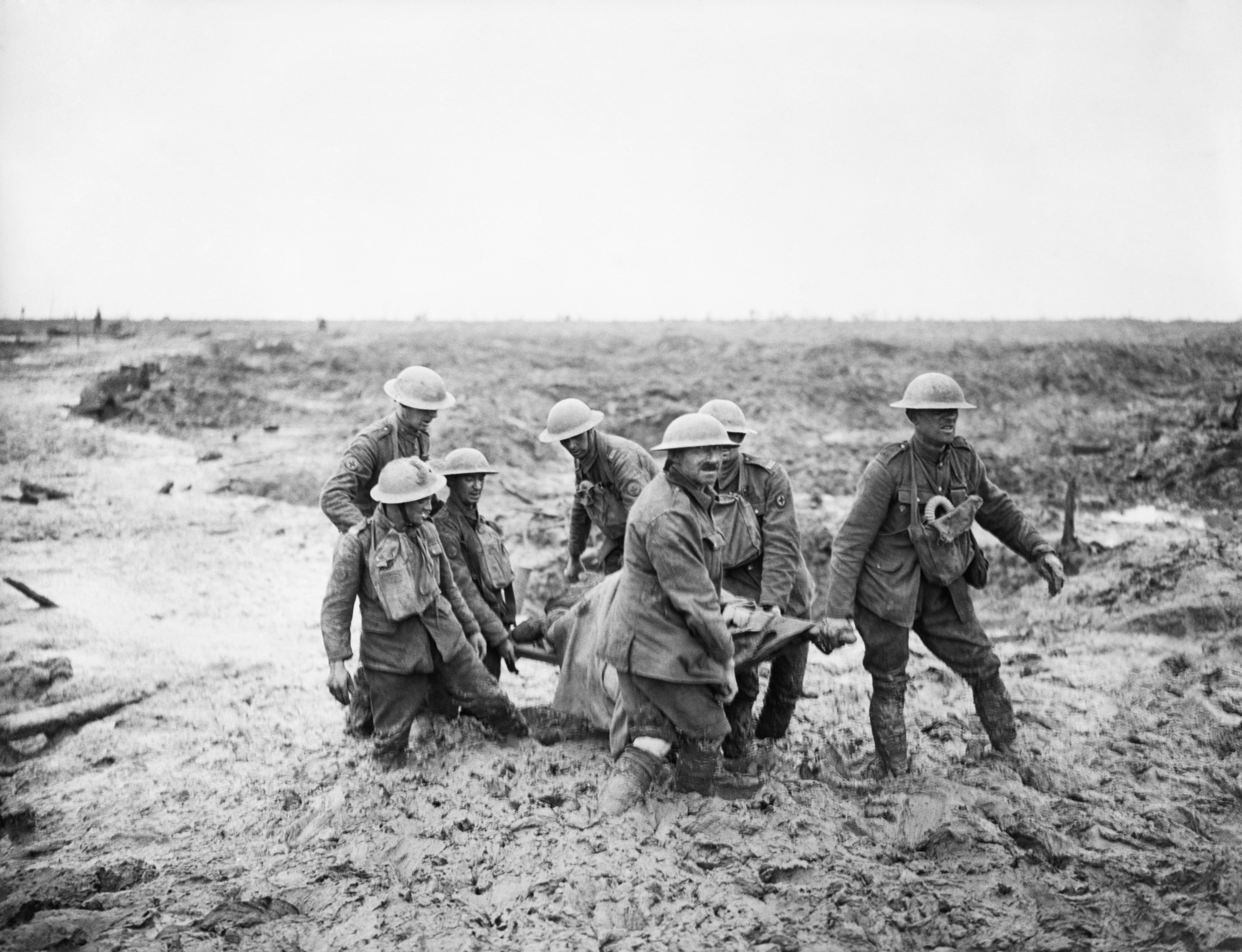
Stretcher-bearers struggle through the mud after the Battle of Pilckem Ridge, 1 August 1917 (Photograph by John Warwick Brooke).

The offensive opened with the Battle of Pilckem Ridge on 31 July 1917 after 12 days' bombardment of the German positions. 16th RB with a frontline strength of 16 officers and 574 ORs moved up to its assembly position in 'Bilge Trench' the night before. The ground was already muddy, and rain returned during the assembly. 117th Brigade attacked with 17th KRRC (left) and 16th SF (right) in front, followed by 16th RB and 17th SF respectively. The two rear battalions including their HQs set off close behind the first line in the hope that they would all get across No man's land before any enemy counter-barrage came down. The lead battalions were to capture the German front line system, then the 16th RB and 17th SF would pass through to capture the second system (the 'Kitchener System') and secure the crossings over the Steenbeek stream. 16th RB formed up with A and C Companies in the first two waves, B and D in the next two, with one platoon of each of the latter companies designated as 'moppers up'. Each platoon was organised in the new attack formation with one section each of riflemen, bombers, rifle bombers and Lewis gunners. Zero hour was 03.50, about 30 minutes before dawn, when the British barrage of artillery and machine gun fire came down, while oil drums were projected onto the German front line by mortars (the resulting fires helped the attackers keep direction in the dark). The assault troops moved out into No man's land. Then at Zero plus six minutes the barrage lifted off the enemy front line and began creeping forward, while the first wave of attackers went in. 16th RB's waves set off 50 yards (46 m) behind 17th KRRC following the barrage. The counter-barrage came down at Zero plus 8 minutes, but by that time the battalion was crossing the German front line and escaped it. 17th KRRC had found the German front trench 'badly knocked about' by the artillery, and met little resistance. It settled down to consolidate a line under a protective barrage. The barrage moved on at Zero plus 20 minutes, and the first wave of 16th RB passed through towards their own first objective of 'Kitchener's Wood'. Resistance was hardening, with machine gun fire coming from 'Racecourse Farm' on the battalion's left: this was rushed and then finished off by the moppers-up. Another machine gun in 'Bochcastell Estaminet' was silenced by rifle grenades and Lewis guns. The first two companies took their objective of 'Canoe Trench' and dealt with snipers and machine guns in Kitchener's Wood. The right company came under fire from a camouflaged concrete machine gun emplacement, but this was captured. Once Kitchener's Wood was cleared, the leading companies dug in on their assigned line and the rear companies moved up to the protective barrage, ready to advance to the Steenbeek. The barrage moved on at Zero plus 3 hours 40 minutes. A group of three strongpoints at 'Regina Farm' were enveloped and overcome using the new platoon tactics with rifle grenades, Lewis guns and P bombs. There was little further opposition and the battalion crossed the Steenbeek at 08.00, establishing its line about 30 yards (27 m) beyond with Lewis guns pushed out in front to cover the digging. The advanced troops lit flares to confirm their position to a contact aircraft a few minutes later. The trench was sufficiently deep to give some cover by 09.00. At 10.25 118th Bde passed through to attack the division's final set of objectives, but at this point the plan began to break down. Two hours later 118th Bde fell back before counter-attacks. At 14.00 16th RB's patrols reported enemy parties moving forward with larger forces behind. Battalion HQ sent up the SOS rockets and what Lt-Col Coke described as a 'splendid barrage' stopped the counter-attackers about 300 yards (270 m) from the Steenbeek. 17th KRRC sent up two companies to reinforce 16th RB holding the line of the Steenbeek, which became the British front line. 39th Division's attack was the most successful of a disappointing day. Under incessant rain, the Steenbeek valley became a morass, and simply maintaining positions was an ordeal. 117th Brigade was supposed to have been relieved on the night of 31 July/1 August, but 118th Bde had been much harder hit, and 117th remained in position. By 3 August the men were becoming exhausted and casualties mounting; 16th RB was finally relieved on 4 August and went back into support in the old German front line. Next day it went back to the dugouts at Canal Bank for rest. Since 31 July 16th RB had lost 2 officers and 30 ORs killed, 7 officers and 271 ORs evacuated wounded, and 18 ORs missing. A number of wounded officers and men remained at duty, including Lt-Col Coke, who was awarded the DSO. The battalion had taken 154 prisoners and seven machine guns.

On 7 August the battalion was withdrawn by rail to a camp at Caëstre to reorganise and train, and then went up by motor buses on 13 August to a forward camp at 'Ridge Wood' where it was in reserve. It moved up to 'Battle Wood' during the Battle of Langemarck, 16–18 August, suffering a number of casualties, but playing no part in the battle. Afterwards it remained in reserve in the Hollebeke sector. On 29/30 August it went by bus to 'Chippewa Camp' and then to the Steenvoorde training area to prepare for the next operation, the Battle of the Menin Road Ridge. Here a draft of 77 reinforcements joined. On 12 September 16th RB went to the forward area in the 'Shrewsbury Forest' sector as brigade reserve, then on 19 September into the front line in Battle Wood. On 20 September 39th Division attacked with just 117th Bde to provide a defensive right flank for 41st Division's attack. The plan was for 16th RB on the left of 117th Bde to advance at Zero and capture the Black and Red lines, after which 17th KRRC would pass through to capture and consolidate the Blue and Green lines. B and D Companies with their objective of the Black Line wore a black tape on their right shoulder strap and A and C Companies going on to the Red Line wore red tape. The assembly was complete and the men lined up on their jumping-off tapes by Zero (05.40). The barrage came down and as it began creeping forward the battalion set off close behind in order to avoid the inevitable counter-barrage. A strongpoint at 'Lower Star Post' was overwhelmed with rifle grenades and enveloped, the whole Black Line was taken within 10 minutes, and the right company was on the Red line by Zero plus 18 minutes. However, the brigade of 41st Division to the left failed to get forward, and both 16th RB and 17th KRRC were raked by machine gun fire from that flank throughout their 800 yards (730 m) advance. The exposed left company of 16th RB lost all its officers and 95 ORs. A party went across the divisional boundary to deal with the nearest of these machine gun emplacements. Meanwhile, seeing his company stopped by a machine gun in front, Sergeant William Burman told his men to wait while he went forward alone, killed the gunner, and carried the captured gun on to the company objective. About 15 minutes later he observed that 16th SF to the right was held up by enfilade fire from a party of about 40 Germans in 'Bulgar Wood', so with two other men he ran forward, got behind the enemy, killed six and captured 2 officers and 29 ORs. He was later awarded the Victoria Cross (VC). 17th KRRC now passed through and reached the Blue line, but was unable to go on to the Green because of the fire from the left. Instead of acting as a defensive right flank for 41st Division, 16th RB and 17th KRRC now had to form a defensive left flank for 117th Bde. About 19.30 the enemy were seen gathering for a counter-arrack, but once again the SOS barrage put a stop to that. 16th RB's casualties had been heavy, amounting to 2 officers and 27 ORs killed and died of wounds, 9 officers and 150 ORs evacuated wounded, 9 missing. It was relieved the same night and went back to the starting line, before moving back to bivouacs at 'Beggar's Rest' next day. On 22 September it was moved by buses to 'Kempton Camp' near Westoutre, where a draft of 70 reinforcements joined. It went back to Ridge Wood in divisional reserve on 25 September and that night moved up into support for 118th Bde which attacked next day (the Battle of Polygon Wood). 16th RB was not engaged, other than a party of 63 ORs attached to 134th Field Ambulance, Royal Army Medical Corps, as auxiliary stretcher-bearers, but suffered a number of casualties nevertheless. It then went to Dranouter and resumed training.

On 15 October 117th Bde became divisional reserve, with 16th RB at Willebeke Camp, then the brigade moved up to the 'Tower Hamlets' and Shrewbury Forest sector. 16th RB was in brigade reserve in the 'Canada' and 'Hedge Street' tunnels from 19 October, where it suffered daily casualties before returning to Willebeke on 24 October. Here it was joined by over 200 reinforcements, almost half of them Army Service Corps men drafted to the infantry. It was at Bois Camp, training and providing working parties, while the Second Battle of Passchendaele was being fought. On 7 November it moved back into the trenches at Tower Hamlets, where it sent forward a fighting patrol on 10 November to try to capture the 'Lewis Houses', a group of pillboxes in dead ground. Despite a gas discharge by the REs the pillboxes were found to be strongly held and the ground was thigh-deep in mud, so the patrol withdrew. On that day the Battle of Passchendaele and the whole Ypres offensive came to an end.

=== Winter 1917–18 ===
The battalion continued to hold the line in the Polderhoek sector. It sent forward a fighting patrol on 18 November to secure a mound in front on which the Germans had posted three machine guns. The mud was deep and the patrol came under machine gun fire, but it did secure an abandoned pillbox in No man's land that the enemy had tried to reoccupy. After that the battalion was in camps and billets in the rear areas on working parties and in the Steenvoorde–Watou training area. It returned to the line in the Poelcappelle sector on 30 December, alternating with 17th KRRC in the 'Hill Top Farm' reserve trenches. 39th Division was relieved on 21 January and moved south to Heudicourt, joining Fifth Army, which had taken over the sector facing St Quentin. 16th RB alternated with 17th KRRC in the front line in the Vaucelette Farm–Gouzeaucourt sector, carrying out occasional raids.

By early 1918 the BEF was suffering a manpower crisis, and was forced to reduce infantry brigades from four to three battalions: in February 17th SF was disbanded from 117th Bde, which meant additional trench duty for the remaining battalions. In early March they were engaged in digging defences in anticipation of a German offensive.

=== Spring offensive ===
The German spring offensive began on 21 March. At the time 39th Division was out of the line in GHQ Reserve, with 16th RB at 'Sandeman Camp' at Heudicourt, but its huts came under heavy fire from high explosive, gas and shrapnel when the bombardment began at 04.30. The first shell hit the signal office and killed most of the battalion HQ signallers. The battalion immediately moved to its designated assembly position behind Heudicourt, but this was also heavily shelled so it moved back to Sorel Wood. At 19.00 117th Bde moved to a position south-east of Saulcourt under heavy shellfire to dig in along the 'Saulcourt Switch Line' and protect the exposed right flank of 21st Division. Next morning the division in front began to withdraw from the Forward Position, covered by 16th RB, which opened heavy fire on the Germans seen assembling around the village. By 14.00 it was clear that the battalion was about to be surrounded, but no orders were received to withdraw. At 16.30 the enemy opened a bombardment of the village, causing heavy casualties, and 30 minutes later delivered a strong attack from north, east and south. Finally the battalion was ordered to withdraw, and about 54 men got away to assemble behind the rest of 117th Bde at Tincourt Wood in the 'Green Line' defences, though many men who had become detached were able to rejoin later. The following morning (23 March) dawn broke with a heavy mist through which the enemy attacked in great numbers. Fierce fighting broke out along 117th Bde's whole front, and the brigade was withdrawn to the 'Main Corps Line' at 08.00. 39th Division was being forced to retreat by the collapse of 21st Division's position, and at 15.00 117th Bde was again ordered to retire. It went back to a position near Mont Saint-Quentin, and made a stand on this ridge with 16th RB at the right of the line alongside 118th Bde. By now the roads were clogged with retreating transport (cross-country movement over the old Somme battlefield being almost impossible for vehicles). The enemy had taken Péronne and was threatening to surround Mont St Quentin, so 117th Bde fell back slowly to cover the transport on the Cléry-sur-Somme–Péronne road. When the transport had cleared the Somme crossing, 39th Division was ordered to cross by the wooden bridge. 117th Brigade made a stand to cover the withdrawal of 116th and 118th Bdes, and then crossed the bridge under shellfire and air attack before it was blown up by the engineers. The depleted battalions of 117th Bde then went into reserve to get some hot food and a night's rest.

At 07.00 next morning (24 March) 117th Bde took up a position on the south bank of the Somme Canal at Feuillères. The Actions at the Somme Crossings began that morning: fighting took place at Cléry, but no attacks were made on 117th Bde. That night the enemy approached the bridge at Feuillères and the REs destroyed it. During 25 March the battalion saw large numbers of Germans moving along the north bank of the canal towards Curlu, and caused many casualties among them with rifle and Lewis gun fire. However, formations to the left had given way, and 117th Bde was ordered to extend in that direction to prevent the enemy crossing the Somme. 16th RB took up a position from Frise to Éclusier-Vaux. It took two attempts to blow up the bridge at Frise. That evening 117th Bde was threatened from the right and had to take up a north–south line. At 09.00 next morning (26 March) the Germans launched a heavy attack (the Battle of Rosières) and at 08.00 118th Bde on the battalion's right began to fall back. 16th RB was in grave danger of being cut off with its backs to the Somme. 117th Bde made a fighting withdrawal towards Cappy, and then took up a west-facing line at Proyart. The German attack was renewed at 08.00 on 27 March, making no progress against 39th Division. However the enemy got through between Proyart and the Somme, forcing 117th Bde to form a defensive flank, falling back at 11.00 towards the Morcourt ridge. About 12.15 117th Bde was forced to give up about 1,000 yards (910 m) more ground, but it then formed up and counter-attacked, regaining its line south of Morcourt. By 18.00 it was firmly established, and the enemy could be seen similarly digging in on a ridge outside Proyart, about 1,000 yards (910 m) away. Casualties had been so heavy that 16th RB and 17th KRRC were temporarily reorganised as a composite battalion under Lt-Col Coke of 16th RB. The Germans had now crossed the Somme and cut 39th Division's communications and orders arrived at 04.00 to continue the retreat through Harbonnières to Cayeux. The Rifle Battalion pulled back at 06.00, suffering heavy casualties from shellfire, but the remnants of the brigade and the divisional pioneer battalion (13th Gloucestershire Regiment (Forest of Dean)) assembled south of Weincourt forming a left flank defence facing north, with the combined Rifle Battalion in the centre. Several attacks on this line were broken up with rifle and Lewis gun fire, and the Rifles caught some enemy guns unlimbering up at 1,700 yards (1,600 m), firing on them with good results. During the night the division again fell back, 117th Bde pulling out by 03.00 and forming up along the Démuin–Marcelcave road, the battalions reorganising and sorting out stragglers. The next day (29 March) was uneventful, and early on 30 March the division was withdrawn into reserve in a wood 2,000 yards (1,800 m) north-west of Aubercourt. However, the enemy attacked the front line troops heavily, driving them back, and in the afternoon 39th Division delivered a counter-attack. This gained a temporary success, but at 17.00 the line was forced back again. 3rd Australian Division then passed through and delivered an effective counter-attack, allowing 39th Division finally to be withdrawn to Villers-Bretonneux. It then marched back to Longueau, east of Amiens, arriving at 06.00 on 31 March, where the men were given a hot meal and billeted in the village. The 'Great Retreat' was over. Here 16th RB was re-established as a separate unit. Its losses since 21 March had been 3 officers and 12 ORs killed or died of wounds, 14 officers and 141 ORs wounded, 7 officers and 293 ORs missing, for a total of 470 casualties, virtually the whole front line strength of the battalion.

=== Composite units ===
The survivors of 117th Bde went to Bovelles, and then marched by stages and by train, arriving on 10 April in the Saint-Omer area where 39th Division was concentrating behind Second Army. The plan had been to use the much-reduced division to train divisions of the American Expeditionary Forces now arriving on the Western Front. However, Second Army had been depleted to send troops south to help stem the German offensive, and then on 9 April it was attacked itself (the Battle of the Lys). 39th Division was its only reserve – even though each brigade was now hardly stronger than a single battalion – and the division was ordered to organise a composite brigade from its units to go back into the line. '39th Composite Brigade' comprised four battalions, of which 117th Bde formed No 3 under Lt-Col Coke (16th RB), with one and a half companies (6 officers and 333 ORs) provided by 17th KRRC, half a company (114 ORs under the adjutant, Capt G.V. Taylor) by 16th RB and two companies by 16th SF. No 3 Battalion went up to Ridge Wood Camp under 21st Division on 14 April, where it was shelled and suffered casualties. On 12 April another 236 ORs left 16th RB by lorry to help form No 5 Composite Bn under Lt-Col C.H.N. Seymour of 17th KRRC. A & B Companies of No 5 Battalion were provided by 117th Bde, C by 116th Bde, D by 118th Bde and the pioneers of 13th Gloucesters. On 14 April it went to Borre, near Hazebrouck, and was attached to 1st Australian Division.

The composite brigade fought in a number of actions with XXII Corps. On 16 April the two Rifle companies of 3rd Bn (C & D) were in support while the rest counter-attacked on Wytschaete Ridge. Next day the battalion came under the orders of 9th (Scottish) Division, with the two Rifle companies attached to 1st South African Regiment, suffering numerous casualties from the incessant shellfire. From 20 April they were at Awapuni Lines, near Dickebusch, providing working parties, until the battalion was shelled out of its camp on 25 April and had to form a defensive flank towards the Vierstraat crossroads. The enemy broke through over the crossroads, and the KRRC/RB company took up a position from Ridge Wood to 'Confusion Corner', about 500 yards (460 m) north-east of Vierstraat. It maintained this position until 14.00 next day, when the enemy were seen massing behind Vierstraat. The British artillery came down on this concentration, and combined with the rifle and machine gun of the defenders this attack was broken up. The company was later moved back to the GHQ Second Line and then to a camp at Outerdom where it remained, although it was shelled out of the camp into an old trench line on 29 April. Casualties had been so heavy that Nos 2 and 3 Composite Bns were amalgamated into one. However, the crisis had passed. No 5 Battalion rejoined 39th Division on 30 April, the remainder of the Composite Brigade arriving on 5 May.

=== Training cadre ===
Because of the Army's shortage of trained replacements, GHQ decided that several divisions would not be brought up to strength but instead would be reduced to 'Training cadres' (TCs) as instructors to the US Army divisions now arriving. 39th Division was among those selected, and while the Composite Brigade was detached it had begun training troops of the 77th US Infantry Division, the 'details' of 16th RB building rifle ranges, assault courses etc. Officer instructors from 16th RB were attached to 2nd and 3rd Bns, 308th Infantry Regiment, at Bayenghem and Hellebrouck. Major J. Groombridge arrived from 17th KRRC to command the details of 16th RB. After the composite battalions had rejoined, the infantry units of 39th Division were reduced to training cadres (TCs) during May. A TC generally comprised 10 officers and 45 ORs; between 16 and 23 May the 277 surplus men of 16th RB were sent to the base depot at Étaples to reinforce other units. A large number of additional TCs from other formations now joined the division.

In mid-May 2/308 and 3/308 US battalions moved to the Third Army area, accompanied by their instructors. When they returned on 26 May 16th RB TC had moved to Nortbécourt to be affiliated to Regimental HQ Company and 2nd Bn, 117th US Infantry Regiment, of 30th US Division, which arrived at on 28 May. The 16th RB TC was commanded by Acting Lt-Col G.V. Taylor until he went to a staff position at 39th Divisional HQ, when Lt-Col Seymour from 17th KRRC took over. The training was not without its dangers: on 26 June Regimental Sergeant-Major Mash loaded a live rifle grenade for a US private to fire, However the trainee set off the detonator rather than firing the rifle, and then became flustered and could not operate the safety catch to fire it. Seeing an imminent accident, RSM Mash seized the rifle and threw it away, being slightly injured when the grenade exploded in mid-air. RSM Mash was awarded the Meritorious Service Medal (MSM). On 26 June 117th Bde HQ left to begin training the 80th US Division, and battalion HQ of 17th KRRC became HQ of 'E Brigade, Training Group' commanding the remaining TCs at Recques, with Lt-Col Seymour as acting brigade commander until 117th Bde HQ returned to the training group at the end of July and resumed command.

On 16 August the TC of 16th RB was transferred to Abancourt to join 66th (2nd East Lancashire) Division, which was also composed of TCs. From 23 August it was at Haudricourt, setting up a reinforcement camp, and then a camp for malaria cases among the reinforcements arriving from the Salonika Front. On 6 September Lt-Col F.E. Young arrived from 8th RB to replace Lt-Col Seymour in command of 16th RB. On 20 September 66th Division began reforming for active service, less its 197th Bde which transferred with the TCs (jncluding 16th RB) to the Lines of Communication. From 28 September the TC took over training a batch of 'details' from 50th (Northumbrian) Division as well as more malarial cases, cross-posting some of them to the TC of 25th Northumberland Fusiliers. Trained drafts were then sent off to the units at the front. The cadre was still carrying out this duty at No 1 Line of Communication Reception Camp when hostilities were ended by the Armistice with Germany on 11 November.

=== Post-Armistice ===
16th RB rejoined 39th Division when that formation was reconstituted from 197th Bde on 18 November 1918. The division then took over No 2 Line of Communication Reception Camp at Martin-Église, which was redesignated 117th Bde on 19 November. 16th RB and its malarial personnel went into billets in Aumale on 1 January 1919 and then the cadre moved to Le Havre in 16 January, where Lt-Col Young took command of 'B Wing', General Base Depot, which was administered by 16th RB. In February the cadre moved to 'C Wing'. Demobilisation was under way and leave was being widely granted, but the TC continued in existence until 2 June, when 16th (Service) Battalion, Rifle Brigade (St Pancras) was disbanded and the remaining officers and men were transferred to the 'Details Battalion', Rifle Brigade, at the Le Havre base.

== Memorials ==
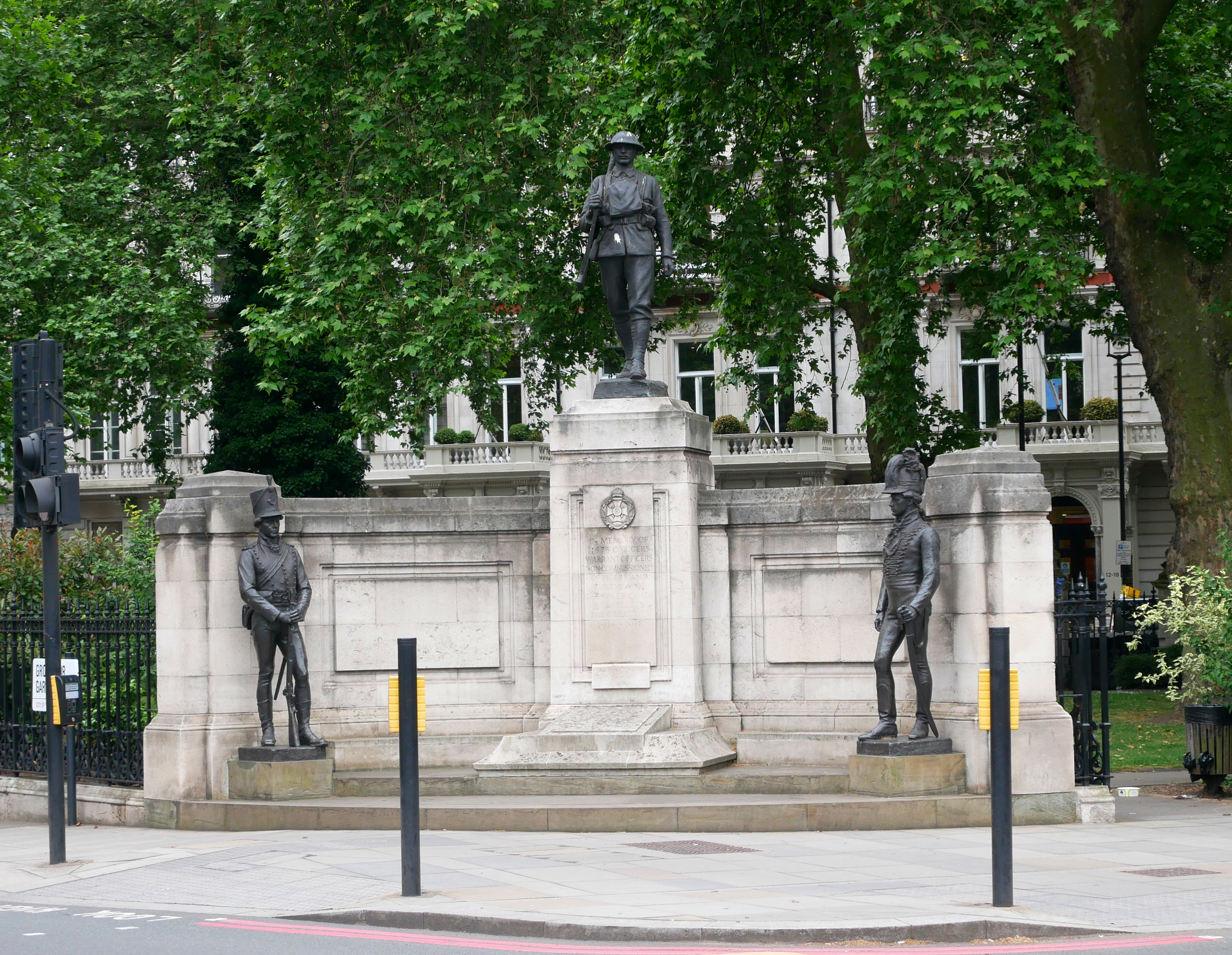
The Rifle Brigade Memorial, Grosvenor Gardens

The Rifle Brigade War Memorial stands at the corner of Grosvenor Gardens, in Westminster, with sculpture by John Tweed. The Rifle Brigade Roll of Honour is held in Winchester Cathedral.

== Insignia ==
The battalion wore the Rifle Brigade's Maltese cross badge on service caps and an 'R.B.' title on the shoulder strap in brass or embroidered in Rifle green. During training the 16th RB wore a khaki horizontal strip on both upper arms beneath the shoulder with 'ST.PANCRAS' embroidered on it in green; from October 1915 this became a curved strip. In France the battalion adopted 117th Bde's mid-green half-oval, distinguished by a black Maltese Cross embroidered on it. The formation sign for 39th Division, also worn on the upper arm, was a white square with three light blue vertical stripes.
