= Edward Holmes =

Edward Holmes may refer to:

- Edward Holmes (architect) (1832–1909), English architect
- Edward Holmes (field hockey) (1880–1924), Irish field hockey player and Olympic medallist
- Edward Holmes (musicologist) (1797–1859), English musicologist and music critic
- Edward Holmes (rugby) (1862–1932), English rugby union player and referee
- Edward Lorenzo Holmes (1828–1900), American ophthalmologist
- Edward C. Holmes (born 1965), British evolutionary biologist and virologist
- Edward Carleton Holmes (1843–1932), one of the solicitors who drew up the first rules of Rugby Football Union
- Edward Morell Holmes (1843–1930), British botanist, curator and lecturer
- Lefty Holmes (nicknamed Eddie; 1907–1987), American baseball pitcher

== See also ==
- Edward Holmes Baldock (1812–1875), British Conservative Party politician
- Ed Holmes, founder of Saint Stupid's Day Parade
