= West London School of Art =

Former art school in London, England

Coordinates: 51.522°N 0.142°W

The West London School of Art founded in either 1861 or 1862 as the Marylebone and West London School of Art, (Note: The Society of Arts (1863) notes that the school had begun two years prior to its first annual distribution of prizes to students on 14 July 1863. Carteret-Bisson writing in 1884 gave the date of founding as 1862. Glasgow University's Mapping the Practice and Profession of Sculpture database (2011) gives the date of the founding as 1870.) was an educational establishment in London, England. The school worked with the Science and Art Department in South Kensington and offered lessons including architectural and life drawing.

The school began at a building in Wells Street and had 59 pupils in May 1862, reaching a peak for the site of 125 in February 1863. The school then moved to a building in Portland Place in either April or May 1863. After a full month at its new location, the number of students had increased to 140. In 1867, the West London school came third behind schools in Edinburgh and Glasgow in the number of prizes awarded for works sent to South Kensington for examination. In the same year, the pupil attendance had increased to 492.

A later report gave 501 pupils during 1871, and by 1873, the school was located at 204, Oxford Street.

On 23 January 1880, the school moved to new premises at 155, Great Titchfield street, where it was described as one of the six largest art schools in the kingdom. The building included a sculpture gallery, a life-class room and other rooms for architecture, design and modelling classes. By this time, its student body had increased to 581.

In March 1886, correspondence between Mr Patterson of the West London school and the Sunderland School of Science and Art identified a significant fall in pupil numbers. The letters suggested this was due to a change in government rules, which allowed elementary schools to teach art classes. This led to fewer students wanting to attend specialised art schools. The number of students continued to decline into the late 1880s and the school was absorbed into the larger Regent Street Polytechnic in around 1889. (Note: Glasgow University's Mapping the Practice and Profession of Sculpture database (2011) gives the date of the merger as 1882, but this is not supported by contemporary sources.) Within a year, the number of students had risen to 600, making it the largest art school in London. The Polytechnic's art department later separated and merged with the Chelsea Polytechnic in 1964 to form the Chelsea School of Art.

== Notable alumni ==
Students at the school included

- William John Seward Webber (1842–1919), sculptor.
- Julian Ashton (1851–1942), founder of the Julian Ashton Art School in Sydney
- Louis Wain (1860–1939), illustrator
- Walter Alfred Cox (1862–1931), engraver
- Baroness Orczy (1865–1947), Hungarian-born novelist
