= Walter Alfred Cox =

English painter

Walter Alfred Cox (London 10 August 1862 – 10 November 1931 London) was a British printmaker and painter. He mostly worked in etching and mezzotint.

== Life ==
Born at St Pancras, Middlesex, Cox was the fourth son of Thomas Henry Whitmore Cox, an art printer, and his first job after leaving school was as a clerk to a silk merchant in the City of London. In 1879 he was apprenticed to the Danish engraver Joel John Ballin [da] and worked for him in London for three years, while also attending evening classes at the West London School of Art. At the St Pancras Industrial Exhibition of 1880, he entered a crayon drawing and won a silver medal. In 1882, Ballin moved to Copenhagen, to take up appointment as Engraver-Royal to the King of Denmark, and Cox began to earn his living as an etcher working on his own. In the 1890s, he attended photogravure classes at the Regent Street Polytechnic and got a job with Graves and Fores.

Cox gained skill as an engraver, specializing in colour mezzotints, reproducing works by contemporaries and old masters. Most of his work is portraits, but he was also an engraver of landscapes and history paintings.

== Private life ==
On 30 August 1888, at St Matthew's Church, Oakley Square, St Pancras, Cox married Alice Smith, the daughter of John Smith, a coachmaker. Both were aged 26.

In 1911, Cox and his wife were living at 34 Ennis Road, Finsbury Park, and had two unmarried daughters living with them, Elsie Alice, aged 21, and Lilian Muriel, 19. Cox was described as a Fine Art Engraver working at home on his own account.

Cox was still on Ennis Road, when he died on 10 November 1931. He left an estate valued at £912, and probate was granted to his widow.
