= Great Trees of London =

List of trees in London

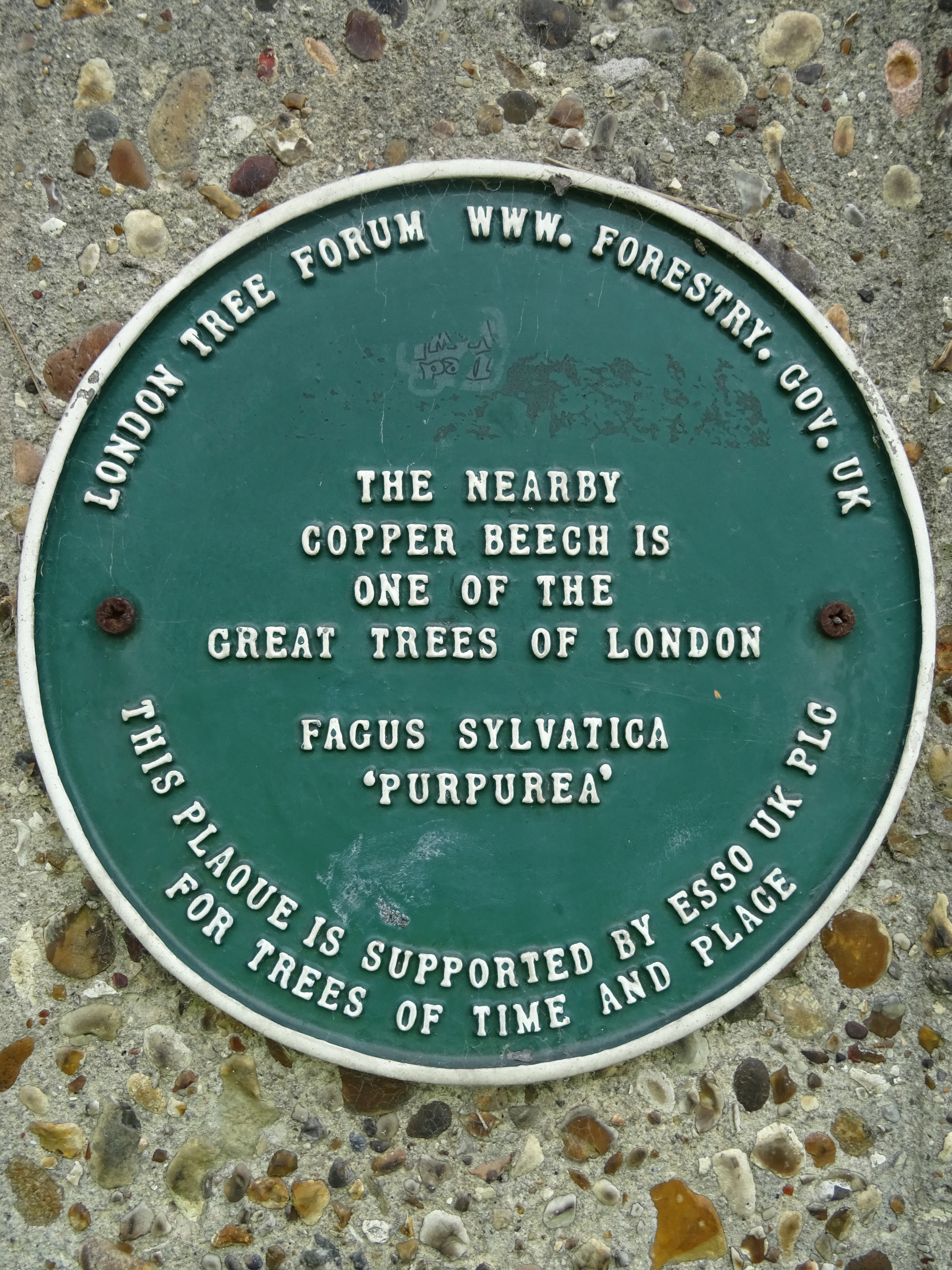
Example of a Great Tree of London plaque, this one is for the South Woodford copper beech

Great Trees of London is a list created by Trees for Cities after the Great Storm of 1987, when the general public were asked to suggest suitable trees. Forty-one were chosen, with a further 20 added in 2008. In 2010, Time Out Guides Limited published a book, The Great Trees of London, listing all 61 trees.

== List of the trees ==
=== Original 41 ===
Name	Image	Location	Borough	Species	Notes
The Dorchester Plane		Dorchester Hotel, Mayfair; 51.506828°N 0.152099°W	Westminster	London plane	Planted in the early 1930s.
The Charlton House Mulberry		Charlton House; 51.481198°N 0.036359°E	Greenwich	Black mulberry	Planted at the beginning of the 1600s, possibly the oldest in the United Kingdom.
The Fulham Palace Oak		Fulham Palace; 51.469566°N 0.214707°W	Hammersmith and Fulham	Holm oak	Oldest holm oak in London, and perhaps the United Kingdom. Possibly dating from 1495, when the palace was built.
The Bexley Charter Oak		Danson Park; 51.454900°N 0.118025°E	Bexley	Pedunculate oak	Well over 200 years old (as of 2010). In 1937 the Bexley borough charter was signed underneath this tree. It now appears in the coat of arms of the London Borough of Bexley.
The Totteridge Yew		St. Andrew's Church, Totteridge; 51.632381°N 0.200558°W	Barnet	Yew	Between 1000 and 2000 years old (as of 2010), London's oldest tree.
The Carshalton Plane		Sutton Ecology Centre Grounds, Carshalton; 51.365301°N 0.165514°W	Sutton	London plane	About 200 years old (as of 2010).
The Lewisham Dutch Elm		Ladywell Fields; 51.450645°N 0.024501°W	Lewisham	European white elm	A plaque in the park incorrectly identifies it as a Flanders elm.
The Riverside Plane		Richmond; 51.456465°N 0.304728°W	Richmond upon Thames	London plane	At over 40 metres in height, it is one of the tallest London planes in the UK.
The Aperfield Cedar		Aperfield Road, Biggin Hill; 51.311487°N 0.041172°E	Bromley	Cedar of Lebanon	
The Morden Cemetery Horse Chestnut		Morden Cemetery, Motspur Park; 51.391791°N 0.229083°W	Merton	Horse chestnut	This "tree" is actually two trees, about 100 years old (as of 2010).
The Wood Street Horse Chestnut		Wood Street, Walthamstow; 51.589258°N 0.004453°W	Waltham Forest	Horse chestnut	Estimated to be 175 years old (as of 2010).
The Ravenscourt Park Tree of Heaven		Ravenscourt Park; 51.496330°N 0.237089°W	Hammersmith and Fulham	Tree of heaven	One of the largest trees of heaven in Britain.
The Ashcombe Sweet Chestnut		Ashcombe Road, Carshalton; 51.359978°N 0.162281°W	Sutton	Sweet chestnut	
The Black Horse Pollard Chestnut		East Sheen; 51.461381°N 0.288973°W	Richmond upon Thames	Horse chestnut	
The Maids of Honour Stone Pine		Richmond Green; 51.461379°N 0.308673°W	Richmond upon Thames	Stone pine	Lost a major limb in August 2026
The Wembley Elm		Wembley; 51.553292°N 0.285526°W	Brent	European white elm	Over 100 years old (as of 2010).
The Battersea Park Hybrid Strawberry Tree		Battersea Park; 51.478312°N 0.155937°W	Wandsworth	Hybrid strawberry tree	Dating from the 1850s. It lost a major limb, which was hovering over the footpath, in a big storm in February 2022, and the next bough up (still seen in the picture) in September 2023.
The Dulwich Park Oak		Dulwich Park; 51.444121°N 0.081079°W	Southwark	Turkey oak	
The Greenwich Spanish Sweet Chestnut		Flower Garden, Greenwich Park; 51.476729°N 0.007199°E	Greenwich	Sweet chestnut	Dating from 1660.
The Greenwich Park Shagbark Hickory		Flower Garden, Greenwich Park; 51.475428°N 0.005180°E	Greenwich	Shagbark hickory	Largest shagbark hickory in the United Kingdom.
The Marble Hill Black Walnut		Marble Hill Park, Richmond; 51.448576°N 0.310797°W	Richmond upon Thames	Black walnut	
The Roehampton Lucombe Oak		Alton Estate, Roehampton; 51.451337°N 0.246961°W	Wandsworth	Lucombe oak	
The North Circular Cork Oak		Hall Lane, Chingford; 51.612050°N 0.031423°W	Waltham Forest	Cork oak	Around 100 years old (as of 2010), although a plaque next to the tree says that it was planted as a sapling by Len Harding in 1959.
The South Woodford Copper Beech		St Mary's Church, South Woodford; 51.598157°N 0.020455°E	Redbridge	Copper beech	
The George Green Sweet Chestnut		George Green, Wanstead; 51.574819°N 0.028049°E	Redbridge	Sweet chestnut	Probably planted in the early 1700s.
The Fairlop Oak		Fulwell Cross roundabout, Ilford; 51.593694°N 0.085271°E	Redbridge	Pedunculate oak	Planted in 1951 in remembrance of its historical predecessor, which lived for around 500 years until 1820, in nearby Hainault Forest.
The Bromley Oak		Outside the Glades shopping centre, Bromley; 51.403414°N 0.018598°E	Bromley	Pedunculate oak	About 400 years old (as of 2010).
The Downe Yew		St Mary's Church, Downe; 51.335768°N 0.054415°E	Bromley	Yew	
The Barn Elms Plane, 'Barney'		Barn Elms, Barnes; 51.474994°N 0.233639°W	Richmond upon Thames	London plane	London's oldest plane tree, planted around 1680. Visible from outside an enclosure.
The Friday Hill Plane		Friday Hill House, Chingford; 51.623621°N 0.006695°E	Waltham Forest	London plane	Now on private grounds, but visible from above the boundary wall on Simmons Lane. The tree is probably dating from the building of the house (1839).
The Valence Park Oak		Valence Park, Becontree; 51.558010°N 0.134955°E	Barking & Dagenham	Holm oak	As of October 2022, the pond enclosure is closed to the public for health and safety reasons, but the tree can be visited up close from Valence House grounds.
The West Wickham Oak		Southcroft Avenue, West Wickham; 51.372793°N 0.014598°W	Bromley	Pedunculate oak	The tree is in a private garden, but largely visible from surrounding public spaces. It is around 800 years old (as of 2010).
The Addington Palace Cedar		Addington Palace; 51.357289°N 0.040391°W	Croydon	Cedar of Lebanon	Access by arrangement. Planted in the 1770s.
The Kenley House Oak		Kenley; 51.314023°N 0.094367°W (approximate)	Croydon	Pedunculate oak	On private land, hidden from view.
The St James's Indian Bean Tree		St James' Church, Piccadilly; 51.508750°N 0.137007°W	Westminster	Indian bean tree	Tree removed in April 2010. Nativity figures have been carved from its wood, and are used by the church every Christmas.
The Charlton House Nettle Tree		Charlton House; 51.480620°N 0.037140°E (approximate)	Greenwich	Hackberry	Tree removed April 2002.
The York House Cut Leaf Beech		York House, Twickenham; 51.446794°N 0.322711°W	Richmond upon Thames	'Asplenifolia' beech	Tree removed winter 2020/21.
The Asgill House Copper Beech		Asgill House, Richmond; 51.460246°N 0.311855°W	Richmond upon Thames	Copper beech	Died winter 2013/14.
The Crane Park Crack Willow		Crane Park; 51.442665°N 0.358306°W	Hounslow	Crack willow	Fallen over circa 2010.
The Kingston Weeping Silver Lime		Thames river path, Kingston; 51.400003°N 0.308936°W	Kingston upon Thames	Silver lime 'Petiolaris'	Tree removed circa 2008.
The Barnsbury Beech		Barnsbury Park, Barnsbury; 51.542847°N 0.110069°W	Islington	Beech	Replaced 2005.

Limited access
Deceased

=== 20 added in 2008 ===
Name	Image	Location	Borough	Species	Notes
The Hendon Japanese Maple		Hendon Park, near the tennis courts 51.582229°N 0.223459°W	Barnet	Japanese maple, Acer palmatum 'Heptalobum'	Planted in the early 1900s.
The Brunswick Plane		Brunswick Square Gardens; 51.524226°N 0.121852°W	Camden	London plane	
The Cheapside Plane		Cheapside, City of London; 51.514431°N 0.094798°W	City of London	London plane	At over 250 years of age, "possibly the oldest tree in The Square Mile".
The Forty Hall Cedar of Lebanon		Forty Hall, Enfield; 51.669391°N 0.067687°W	Enfield	Cedar of Lebanon	Planted around the turn of the 18th century. Severely damaged 11th August 2024.
The Ravenscourt Plane		Ravenscourt Park; 51.496698°N 0.238686°W	Hammersmith and Fulham	London plane	An example of the ‘Baobab’ cultivar of London plane
The Osterley Park Cork Oak		Osterley Park; 51.488575°N 0.351411°W,	Hounslow	Cork oak	Planted 1855.
The Amwell Fig		Amwell Street, Pentonville; 51.528204°N 0.110047°W	Islington	Fig	This "tree" is actually three trees, likely in place since 1827.
The Brockwell Oak		Brockwell Park; 51.448108°N 0.106166°W	Lambeth	Pedunculate oak	Between 500 and 700 years old (as of 2010).
The Tate Plane		Outside Tate Library, Brixton; 51.461049°N 0.115331°W	Lambeth	London plane	
The Stratford Fig		Off High Street, Stratford; 51.534361°N 0.008000°W	Newham	Fig	
The Valentines Park Maple		Valentines Park, Ilford; 51.571527°N 0.072690°E	Redbridge	Field maple	Planted in the 17th century.
The Richmond Royal Oak		Richmond Park; 51.444646°N 0.283504°W	Richmond upon Thames	Pedunculate oak	Around 750 years old (as of 2020).
The Carshalton Sweet Chestnut		Carshalton Park, Carshalton; 51.360458°N 0.163164°W	Sutton	Sweet chestnut	Around 400 years old (as of 2010). Survived a number of arson attacks, which account for the wooden door blocking the hollow at the bottom of the tree.
The Marylebone Elm		By the Garden of Rest, Marylebone High Street; 51.521886°N 0.151724°W	Westminster	Huntingdon elm	Age estimated to be 150 years (as of 2010), over 100 feet (30 meters) high.
The Embankment Plane		North side of Horse Guards Avenue, at the junction with Victoria Embankment, SW1; 51.504796°N 0.123285°W	Westminster	Oriental plane	Planted in 1870.
The Berkeley Plane		Berkeley Square; 51.509465°N 0.145276°W	Westminster	London plane	Planted in 1789.
The Gower Plane		Gower Street; 51.522446°N 0.132461°W	Camden	London plane	
The Regent's Plane		Regent's Park, in the grounds of Regent's University London; 51.525673°N 0.156342°W	Camden	London plane	Access by arrangement. Around 200 years old (as of 2010).
The Abbey Plane		Broad Sanctuary, Westminster Abbey; 51.498972°N 0.128977°W	Westminster	London plane	Accessible from 8am to 5pm.
The Hardy Ash		Old St Pancras Churchyard; 51.535142°N 0.129713°W	Camden	Ash	At just over 250 years of age, the tree fell in December 2022. This is believed to have been due to fungal damage.

Limited access
Deceased

== See also ==
- List of individual trees
- List of Great British Trees
