= Bovelles =

- Commune
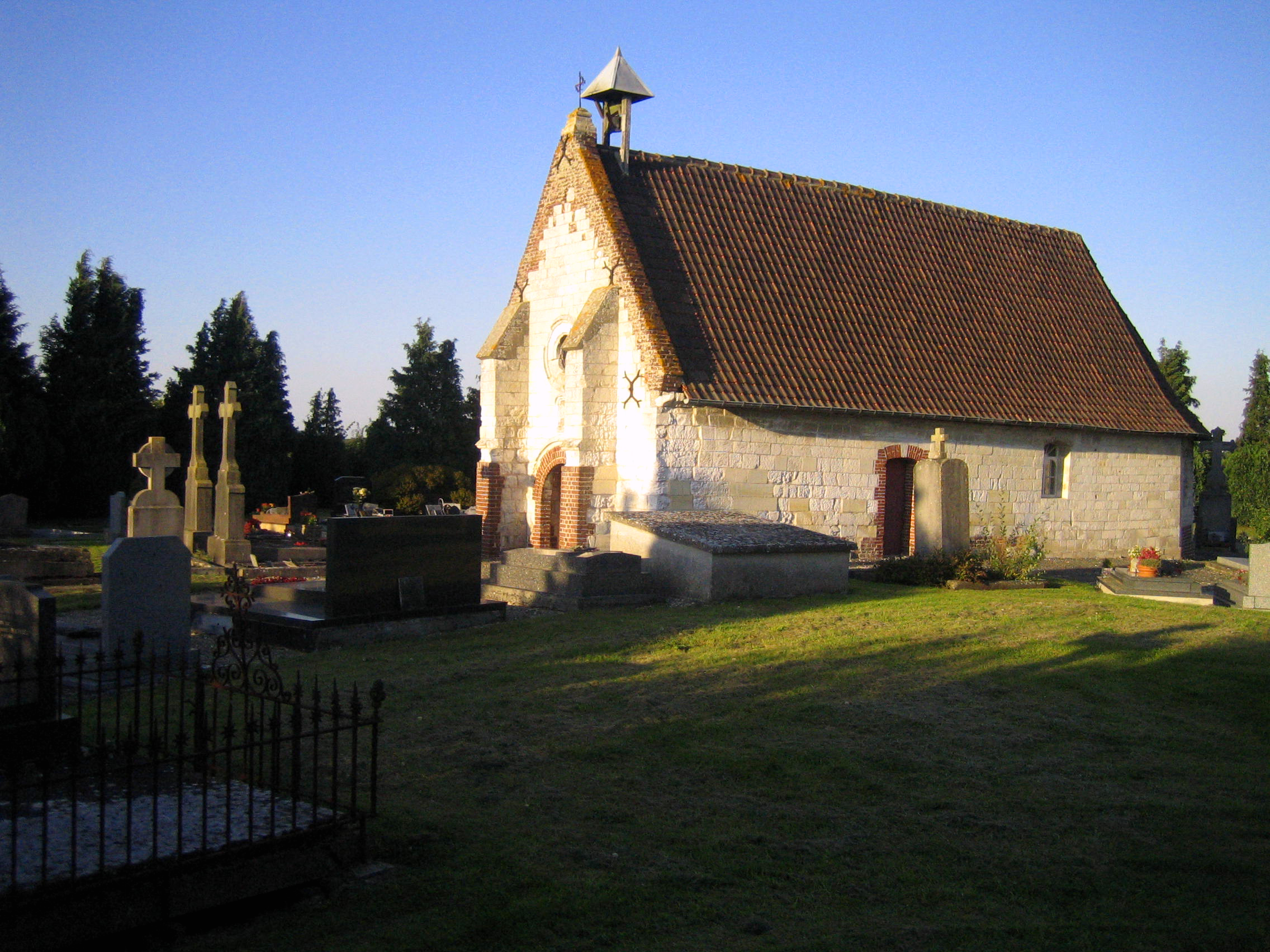
- The cemetery chapel in Bovelles
- Location of Bovelles
- Location within France Location within Hauts-de-France
- Coordinates: 49°53′00″N 2°08′46″E
- Country: France
- Region: Hauts-de-France
- Department: Somme
- Arrondissement: Amiens
- Canton: Ailly-sur-Somme
- Intercommunality: Amiens Métropole

Government
  - Mayor (2020–2026): Mickaël Grimaux
- Area^{1}: 6.87 km^{2} (2.65 sq mi)
- Elevation: 120 m (390 ft)
- Highest elevation: 122 m (400 ft)
- Lowest elevation: 49 m (161 ft)
- Population (2023): 425
  - Density: 61.9/km^{2} (160/sq mi)
- Time zone: UTC+01:00 (CET)
  - Summer (DST): UTC+02:00 (CEST)
- INSEE/Postal code: 80130 /80540
- ^{1} French Land Register data, which excludes lakes, ponds, glaciers > 1 km^{2} (0.386 sq mi or 247 acres) and river estuaries.

Bovelles (French pronunciation: [bɔvɛl]; Picard: Bovelle) is a commune in the Somme department in Hauts-de-France in northern France.

== Geography ==
Bovelles is situated on the D97 road, some 5 miles (8 km) west of Amiens.

== Population ==
Historical population
Year	Pop.	±% p.a.
1968	206	—
1975	241	+2.27%
1982	273	+1.80%
1990	336	+2.63%
1999	340	+0.13%
2007	367	+0.96%
2012	401	+1.79%
2017	434	+1.59%
2023	425	−0.35%
Source: INSEE

== History ==
- 1750 : Construction of the château, the residence of Général de Gribeauval, inventor of a cannon.
- Temporarily chef-lieu of the canton during the French Revolution.

The plaque on the church

- 1870 : Consecration of the new church.
- 1940 : Evacuated during the German occupation
- January 2004 : Bovelles joined the Communauté d'agglomération Amiens Métropole.

== See also ==
- Communes of the Somme department
