= Elizabeth Eiloart =

English novelist

- Born: Elizabeth Darby Adams; 1827; St. Pancras, London
- Died: 22 February 1898 (aged 70–71); Brighton, England
- Occupations: Author and suffragist
- Writing career
- Pen name: Mrs. C. J. Eiloart

Elizabeth Eiloart (1827 – 22 February 1898) was an English novelist, who wrote mostly children's fiction under the name Mrs. C. J. Eiloart. She was also a feminist and suffragist.

== Life ==
Eiloart was born Elizabeth Darby Adams in 1827 in St. Pancras, London, the daughter of Samuel Adams. On 29 September 1849, she married Carl J. G. Eiloart at St Pancras Old Church where they made their home. They had twelve children, five of whom died as children. The survivors were Edith, Ernest, Bernard, Clarence, Arnold, and Blanche. Ernest Eiloart wrote The Laws Relating to Women in 1878. Around 1890, the couple retired to Dane Street in St Leonards-on-Sea where they lived until Carl's death. Elizabeth died on 22 February 1898 in Brighton.

== Feminist activities ==
In 1858, she persuaded Marylebone Swimming Baths to be open for ladies each Wednesday. She was a shareholder in and writer for the English Woman's Journal from its foundation in 1858, and became its editor in 1864.

== Published works ==
- Ernie Elton, the Lazy Boy (1865, new ed. 1876)
- Ernie Elton at School: and What Came of His Going There (1866)
- Ernie Elton at Home and at School (1866)
- Johnny Jordan and His Dog (1866)
- Archie Blake: a Sea-side Story (1867, new ed. 1878)
- The Boys of Beechwood Illustrated (1867)
- The Curate's Discipline (1867)
- Tom Dunstone's Troubles, and How He Got Over Them (1869)
- From Thistles--Grapes? (1870)
- Cris Fairlie's Boyhood: a Tale (1870)
- St. Bede's (1870)
- Just a Woman (1871)
- The Young Squire: or, Peter and His Friends (1872)
- Woman's Wrong (1872)
- Lady Moretoun's Daughter (1873)
- A Boy With an Idea Illustrated (1873, new ed. 1881)
- Love That Lived: a Novel (1874)
- Some of Our Girls (1875, new ed. 1884)
- Kate Randal's Bargain: a Novel (1875)
- Jabez Ebsleigh, M.P.: a Novel (1876)
- His Second Wife: a Novel (1877)
- How He Won Her (1879, new ed. 1883)
- The Dean's Wife (1880, new ed. 1883)
- My Lady Clare (1882)
- Was it Worth the Cost?: a Novel (1883)
- Out of Her Sphere (Bentley, 1872)

== Reception of works ==
Ernie Elton still proved popular amongst school children twenty years after original publication.
