= Edward Carleton Holmes =

Edward Carleton Holmes the Younger (12 February 1843 – 9 April 1932) was one of three practising solicitors who drew up the first rules of Rugby Football Union.

== Early life ==
Holmes was born in St Pancras, London, to Edward Carleton Holmes (Senior), a practising solicitor from Arundel, and Elizabeth Carleton Sayres, from Worthing. At the time of Edward's birth, his parents were living in 31 Bedford Row, Camden Town, London, WC1, close to Gray's Inn Fields. Edward was the eldest of six children.

== Drawing up rugby's rules ==
Edward Carleton Holmes (Yngr) was a practising solicitor with offices in Bloomsbury. He was captain of Richmond Rugby Club between 1866 and 1871 and later became its president. The club was influential in London's rugby scene in the early 1870s, as was Holmes himself.

=== Rugby's first 59 rules ===
On 26 January 1871, the Rugby Football Union held its first meeting to discuss rugby's future with the aim of drawing up some rules of play and to clean up the game. The meeting was held at the offices of Edward Carleton Holmes situated at 31 Bedford Row, Camden Town, the house where Holmes had grown up. The meeting appointed a committee of three persons to draft the rules of rugby. The committee comprised three practising solicitors: Algernon Rutter, Leonard James Maton, and 28-year-old Edward Carleton Holmes (Yngr). Holmes, Rutter and Maton (draftsman) were chosen because they were all former pupils of Rugby School and were therefore knowledgeable about the subject of rugby. This committee eventually drafted the first 59 rules of rugby and had them accepted by the Special General Meeting of the RFU on 24 June 1871. Their most important decision was the elimination of the practise of hacking.

== Marriage ==
Two years later, in 1873, Edward Carleton Holmes (Yngr) married Frances Rosa Davies in Aberystwyth, South Wales where Davies was from, but the couple made their married home in 47 Springfield Road, Marylebone, London, but later moved to Beckenham, Kent.

== Holmes owned Tregullow Offices ==
In 1889, aged 46, Edward Carleton Holmes (Yngr) bought the 'Tregullow Offices' (later Zimapan) from Sir William Robert Williams, the 3rd baronet of Tregullow, Cornwall, and then sold the property to barrister Charles Augustus Vansittart Conybeare.

== Death ==
Following the death of Holmes's father in 1909 – who left his three surviving children a sizeable fortune – Edward Carleton Holmes (Yngr) moved from Kent to a Regency town house at 31 Brunswick Square, Hove, East Sussex, where he died on 9 April 1932 aged 89. In his will, he left £5,378 and a small bequest to his nurse Edith Muriel Wright.
