= William Burman =

British army sergeant, recipient of the Victoria Cross (1897–1974)

William Francis Burman
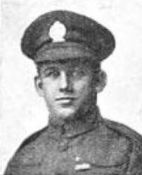
- Born: 30 August 1897; Stepney, London
- Died: 23 October 1974 (aged 77); Cromer, Norfolk
- Military career
- Allegiance: United Kingdom
- Branch: British Army
- Rank: Sergeant
- Units: Rifle Brigade
- Conflicts: World War I
- Awards: Victoria Cross

William Francis Burman (30 August 1897 – 23 October 1974) was an English recipient of the Victoria Cross, the highest and most prestigious award for gallantry in the face of the enemy that can be awarded to British and Commonwealth forces.

== Details ==
Burman was 20 years old, and a sergeant in the 16th (Service) Battalion, Rifle Brigade (St Pancras), British Army, during the First World War when the following deed took place for which he was awarded the VC.

During the Battle of the Menin Road Ridge on 20 September 1917 south-east of Ypres, Belgium, when the advance of his company was held up by a machine-gun at point-blank range, Sergeant Burman shouted to the men next to him to wait a few minutes and going forward to what seemed certain death killed the enemy gunner and carried the gun to the company's objective where he used it with great effect. Fifteen minutes later it was seen that about 40 of the enemy were enfilading the battalion on the right. Sergeant Burman and two others ran and got behind them, killing six and capturing two officers and 29 other ranks.

== Medal ==
His Victoria Cross is displayed at the Imperial War Museum in London, England.

== Bibliography ==
- Snelling, Stephen (2012) [1998]. Passchendaele 1917. VCs of the First World War. The History Press. ISBN 978-0752476667.
