= Hardy Tree =

Tree in London, England

Hardy Ash
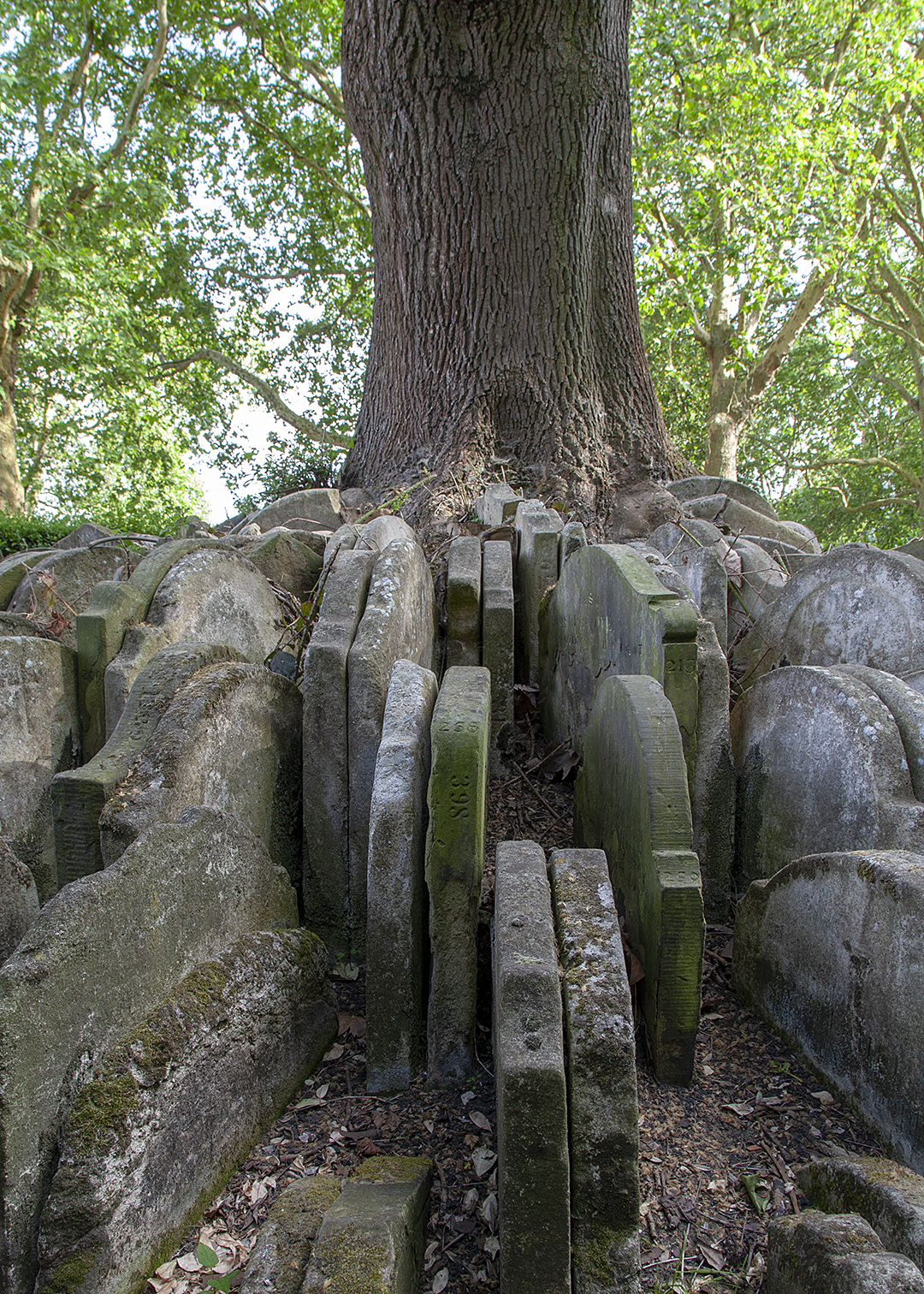
- The Hardy Ash in 2019
- Interactive map of Hardy Ash
- Species: Ash (Fraxinus Excelsior)
- Location: St Pancras Old Church Churchyard, London, United Kingdom
- Coordinates: 51°32′07″N 0°07′47″W
- Date seeded: Possibly c. 1860

The Hardy Tree was an ash tree located in St Pancras Old Church's churchyard in London. The tree is notable for the stacked gravestones embedded at its base. The tree is named for Thomas Hardy and was listed among the Great Trees of London in 2008.

== History ==
The tree was said to have been planted some time around 1860. Shortly afterwards, Thomas Hardy, for whom the tree is named, was involved in the exhumation of graves during his time studying as an architect to make way for the Midland Railway to run through the churchyard. The tree was listed among the Great Trees of London by Time Out in 2008 with an entry suggesting the graves at the base of the tree had been placed there by Hardy himself.

The tree's links to Hardy are tenuous however, and it is possible the tree was self-seeded as late as the 1960s. Despite this, the tree remained known as the Hardy Tree or Hardy Ash. In 2014, the tree was infected with fungus, and with storms further weakening it, the tree would fall in December 2022. Camden Council would announce looking into possibilities to commemorate the tree.

== Description ==
The tree was a common ash and noted for the gravestones which sat at its base. The tree sits within the churchyard of St Pancras Old Church, which, along with connections to Thomas Hardy, also has links to other literary figures, featuring in Charles Dickens' A Tale of Two Cities as well as being the site where Mary Wollstonecraft was originally interred.

== See also ==
- Great Trees of London
- List of individual trees
