= Old man =

Old man, Old Man or The Old Man may refer to:

== Basic meanings ==
- An elderly man
- A father
- A husband
- Commanding officer of a military unit
- Captain of a merchant ship or a warship
- Any male amateur radio operator

== People ==
- La Chapelle-aux-Saints 1 ("The Old Man"), an almost-complete male Neanderthal skeleton discovered in La Chapelle-aux-Saints, France
- Leon Trotsky (1879–1940), Bolshevik revolutionary nicknamed the "Old Man" by both supporters and adversaries
- Richard Benjamin Harrison (1941–2018), American businessman and reality television personality of the series Pawn Stars, nicknamed "The Old Man"
- Joseph Paruta (1929–1986), member of the Gambino crime family nicknamed "Old Man"
- Yitzhak Sadeh (1890–1952), Israeli military commander nicknamed "The Old Man"

== Literature ==
- The Old Man (Gorky play) (Старик), a 1915 play by Maxim Gorky
- The Old Man (Wallace play), a 1931 play by Edgar Wallace
- "Old Man", a poem by Edward Thomas
- "Old Man", a narrative thread in William Faulkner's 1939 novel If I Forget Thee, Jerusalem
- The Old Man (Perry novel), a 2017 novel by Thomas Perry
- The Old Man (Trifonov novel) (Старик), a novel by Yuri Trifonov
- The Old Man and the Sea, a short novel by Ernest Hemingway

== Film, television and stage ==
- Old Man (film), a 2022 American film
- The Old Man (1931 film), based on the Edgar Wallace play of the same name
- The Old Man (2012 film), a 2012 Kazakhstani film
- The Old Man (2019 film), a 2019 Estonian animated film
- "The Old Man" (Seinfeld), an episode of the television series Seinfeld
- The Old Man (TV series), an American thriller drama television series on FX based on the Thomas Perry novel of the same name
- Old Man, a Primetime Emmy Award–winning television movie based on the "Old Man" narrative thread in William Faulkner's novel If I Forget Thee, Jerusalem
- Old Man (Playhouse 90), a 1958 American television play
- Old Man, the CEO of a company in the RoboCop movies
- The Old Man, a character in the film A Christmas Story

== Music ==
- Old Man Luedecke, a Canadian indie banjo band

=== Songs ===
- "Old Man" (song) by Neil Young
- "Old Man", a song by Love, from the album Forever Changes
- "Old Man", a song by Randy Newman from Sail Away, covered by Art Garfunkel, 1974
- "Old Man", a song by Clouds, 1970
- "Old Man", a song by the Collectors, 1967
- "Old Man", a song by Harrys Gym, 2011
- "Old Man", a song by John David, 1976
- "Old Man", a song by Lighthouse, 1972
- "The Old Man" a song by Irving Berlin, sung by Bing Crosby and Danny Kaye, 1954
- "The Old Man", a song by Colm C.T. Wilkinson, 1977
- "The Old Man", a song written by Phil Coulter and sung by John McDermott about a man remembering his father after he has died
- "The Old Man", a song by the Fureys and Davey Arthur, 1982
- "The Old Man", a song by Matt Lucas
- "This Old Man" a children's song

== Geography ==
- Old Man of Coniston, a mountain in the Lake District of England
- Old Man of the Hills, a mountain in Montana
- Old Man of Hoy, a sea stack in Orkney, Scotland
- Old Man of the Lake, a hemlock tree stump floating in Crater Lake, Oregon
- Old Man of the Mountain, a geological formation in New Hampshire
- Old Man of Stoer, a sea stack in Sutherland, Scotland
- Old Man of Storr, a rock formation in the Isle of Skye, Scotland

== Other ==
- Old Man (The Legend of Zelda), a recurring character in The Legend of Zelda video game series
- old man (magazine), a journal of the Union of Swiss Short Wave Amateurs
- Old Man, a name for Gerson Boom in Deltarune
- Old man meme, Hide The Pain Harold

== See also ==
- Old Man of the Mountain (disambiguation)
- Old Man River (disambiguation)
- My Old Man (disambiguation)
- Oldman (disambiguation)
- Der Alte (disambiguation)
