= Oldman =

Oldman may refer to:

== People ==
- Oldman (king) (died 1687), King of the Miskito Nation
- Albert Oldman (1883–1961), British boxer
- C. B. Oldman (1894–1969), English bibliographer
- Crystal Oldman (fl. 2026), British nursing leader
- Gary Oldman (born 1958), British actor
- Hugh Oldman (1914–1988), British soldier and cricketer
- Kurt Oldman, Swiss-born composer
- Mark Oldman (born 1969), American entrepreneur
- Maureen Oldman, known as Laila Morse, (born 1945), British actress
- Richard Oldman (1877–1943), British Army officer
- William Ockelford Oldman (1879–1949), ethnographic collector and dealer

== Places ==
- Oldman Formation, Alberta, Canada
- Oldman Lake, Montana, United States
- Oldman River, Alberta, Canada
- Oldman Wood, Scotland, United Kingdom

== Other uses ==
- Old-man cactus, a plant
- Oldman klipfish
- Oldman wormwood, a flowering plant

== See also ==
- Oldmans
- Old man (disambiguation)
