= Old woman =

Old woman may refer to:

- Old Woman (goddess), a divine hag in Irish and Scottish mythology

== Places ==
- Old Woman Mountains, a mountain range south of Essex, California, USA
- Old Woman River, a river in Ontario, Canada
- Old Woman's Gulch, a ravine in Tacoma, Washington, USA
- Old Woman's Island, one of the seven islands composing the city of Mumbai, India

== Other ==
- Old woman, popular name of the plant species of wormwood Artemisia maritima
- Old Woman meteorite, a large meteorite found in California
- The Old Woman, a novella by Daniil Kharms
- The Old Woman, a play by Robert Wilson

== See also ==
- "Crabbit Old Woman", poem
- Crone
- Hag
- Old lady (disambiguation)
- Old man (disambiguation)
