= Old lady =

Old lady may refer to:

== Slang ==
- A woman at an old age
- Mother
- Girlfriend (American)
- Wife (American)

== Nicknames ==
- Bank of England, United Kingdom's central bank
- Hertha BSC, association football club based in Berlin, Germany
- Juventus FC, association football club based in Turin, Italy
- Anorthosis Famagusta FC, association football club based in Larnaca, Cyprus
- Old lady moth, the owlet moth Mormo maura

== Other uses ==
- The Old Lady, a 1932 Italian film

== See also ==
- Babushka (disambiguation)
- Old man (disambiguation)
- Old woman (disambiguation)
