= Mountain Man =

A mountain man was a North American trapper and explorer in the American frontier including:

- Overmountain Men
- Voyageurs
- Coureurs des bois

Mountain man or mountain men may also refer to:

- Mountain Man (Adventure Time character), in episode "Memories of Boom Boom Mountain"
- "Mountain Man" (Crash Kings song), 2009
- "Mountain Man" (Dean Brody song), 2013
- Mountain Man (band), a singing trio
- Mountain Man (novel), by Vardis Fisher
- Mountainman, a single stage ultramarathon
- Mountain Men (TV series)
- The Mountain Men, 1980 film
- Mountain-men, nickname for Scottish Reformed Presbyterians
- Dashrath Manjhi, Indian laborer who carved a path through a mountain using only a hammer and a chisel
  - Manjhi – The Mountain Man, a 2015 Indian film based on his life

== See also ==
- Old Man of the Mountain (disambiguation)
