= My Old Lady =

My Old Lady may refer to:

- My Old Lady (film), a 2014 British-American film
- "My Old Lady", an episode from season 1 of Scrubs

== See also ==
- Old lady (disambiguation)
