= 117th Brigade (United Kingdom) =

- Active: 10 December 1914–27 April 1915; 12 July 1915–18 November 1918; 19 November 1918–10 July 1919
- Country: United Kingdom
- Branch: New Army
- Type: Infantry
- Size: 3–4 Battalions
- Part of: 39th Division
- Engagements: Battle of the Somme; Battle of the Ancre; Third Battle of Ypres; German spring offensive

Commanders
- Notable commanders: Brig-Gen Richard Oldman; Brig-Gen George Armytage

The 117th Brigade was an infantry formation of the British Army during World War I. Originally raised in December 1914 from locally-raised volunteer units of 'Kitchener's Army' known as 'Pals battalions', it was later redesignated and the number was transferred to a new 'Pals' brigade formed in July 1915. It fought with 39th Division on the Somme and the Ancre, at Ypres and in the German spring offensive. After the appalling casualties in that campaign it was relegated to a training organisation preparing US Army units for active service. It was disbanded shortly after the Armistice with Germany, but the number was transferred to another formation brought under 39th Division. It was disbanded in 1919.

== Original 117th Brigade ==
Alfred Leete's recruitment poster for Kitchener's Army.

On 6 August 1914, less than 48 hours after Britain's declaration of war, Parliament sanctioned an increase of 500,000 men for the Regular British Army. The newly-appointed Secretary of State for War, Earl Kitchener of Khartoum, issued his famous call to arms: 'Your King and Country Need You', urging the first 100,000 volunteers to come forward. This group of six divisions with supporting arms became known as Kitchener's First New Army, or 'K1'. The K2, K3 and K4 battalions, brigades and divisions followed soon afterwards. But the flood of volunteers overwhelmed the ability of the Army to absorb them, and the K5 units were largely raised by local initiative rather than at regimental depots, often from men from particular localities or backgrounds who wished to serve together: these were known as 'Pals battalions'. The 'Pals' phenomenon quickly spread across the country, as local recruiting committees offered complete units to the War Office (WO). On 10 December 1914 the WO authorised the formation of another six divisions and their brigades to command these K5 units, including 117th Brigade in 39th Division. The original 117th Bde comprised the 'Lonsdale Battalion' and three battalions of 'Glasgow Pals':

- 11th (Service) Battalion, Border Regiment (Lonsdale)
- 15th (Service) Battalion, Highland Light Infantry (1st Glasgow) – the Glasgow Tramways Battalion
- 16th (Service) Battalion, Highland Light Infantry (2nd Glasgow) – the Glasgow Boys' Brigade Battalion
- 17th (Service) Battalion, Highland Light Infantry (3rd Glasgow) – the Glasgow Commercial Battalion

== New 117th Brigade ==
39th Division's insignia.

However, on 10 April 1915 the WO decided to convert the K4 battalions into reserve units. The K4 divisions and brigades were broken up and the K5 formations took over their numbers, so that 117th Brigade in 39th Division became 97th Bde in 32nd Division. Authorisation for three new infantry brigades – 116th, 117th and 118th – to constitute a new 39th Division was issued on 12 July 1915.

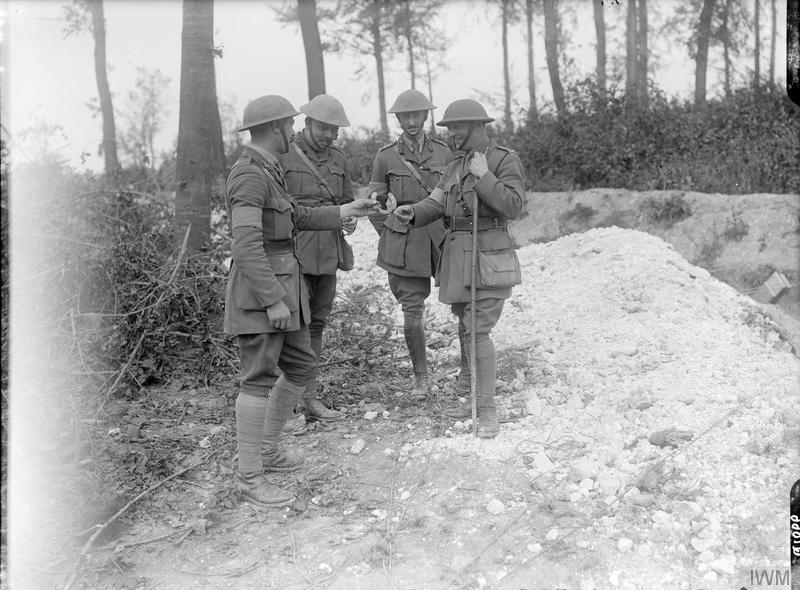
Brigadier General George Armytage (far right), commanding the 117th Infantry Brigade, and members of his brigade staff near Thiepval Wood, July 1916.

The new 39th Division began to assemble around Winchester early in August 1915, but when it moved to Aldershot at the end of September it still consisted of little more than 117th Bde Headquarters (HQ) and three of its Pals battalions: 'St Pancras', 'British Empire League' and the 'Chatsworth Rifles'. In November the division moved to Witley Camp in Surrey, where the remaining units joined and it completed its training. Mobilisation orders were received during February 1916 and after some delays entrainment for Southampton Docks began on 2 March. The brigade embarked and sailed to Le Havre, and by 8 March had completed its landing under the command of Brigadier-General P. Holland, with Major C. Stansfield as Brigade major and Captain A.H. Fetherstonhaugh as staff captain. It then moved to the divisional concentration area at Blaringhem in First Army's area.

=== Order of Battle ===
117th Brigade was constituted as follows:

- 16th (Service) Battalion, Sherwood Foresters (Chatsworth Rifles) –joined at Hursley 2 September 1915
- 17th (Service) Battalion, Sherwood Foresters (Welbeck Rangers) –joined at Aldershot October 1915; disbanded 21 February 1918
- 17th (Service) Battalion, King's Royal Rifle Corps (British Empire League) – assigned 16 July, joined at Hursley 1 September 1915
- 16th (Service) Battalion, Rifle Brigade (St Pancras) – joined at Hursley August 1915
- 117th Brigade Machine Gun Company, Machine Gun Corps – disembarked at Le Havre 16 May and joined brigade 18 May 1916; transferred to 39th Divisional MG Battalion by 14 March 1918 (Note: Although the Official History's Order of Battle records that 117th Bde MG Co disembarked at Le Havre (presumably from the Machine Gun Corps training centre at Grantham like 116th Bde MG Co) and joined the brigade two days later, the bulk of the manpower was actually provided by drafts each of 1 officer and 35 ORs from the infantry battalions, as was the case with 118th Bde MG Co.)
- 117th Trench Mortar Battery – formed within the brigade as 117/1 and 117/2 by 14 April 1916, became 117th TM Bty on 18 June; personnel seconded from the infantry battalions; equipped with 3-inch Stokes mortars

=== Service ===
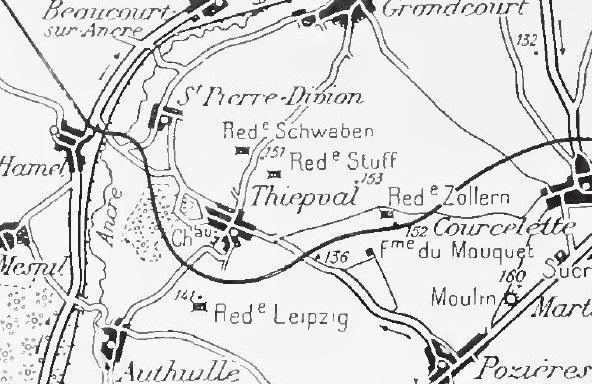
The Ancre battlefield, including Thiepval and the Stuff Redoubt.

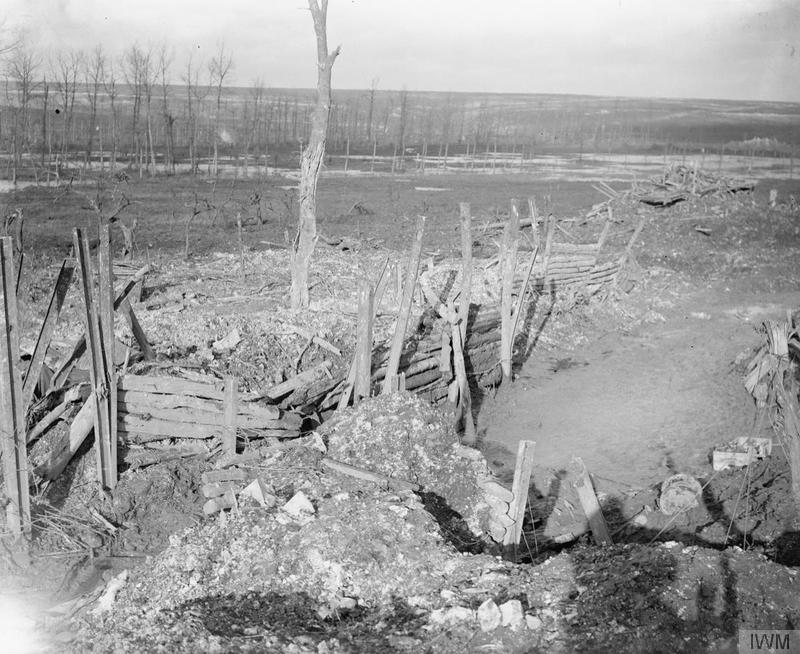
German trench at St Pierre-Divion with the Ancre in the background, after the fighting in November 1916.

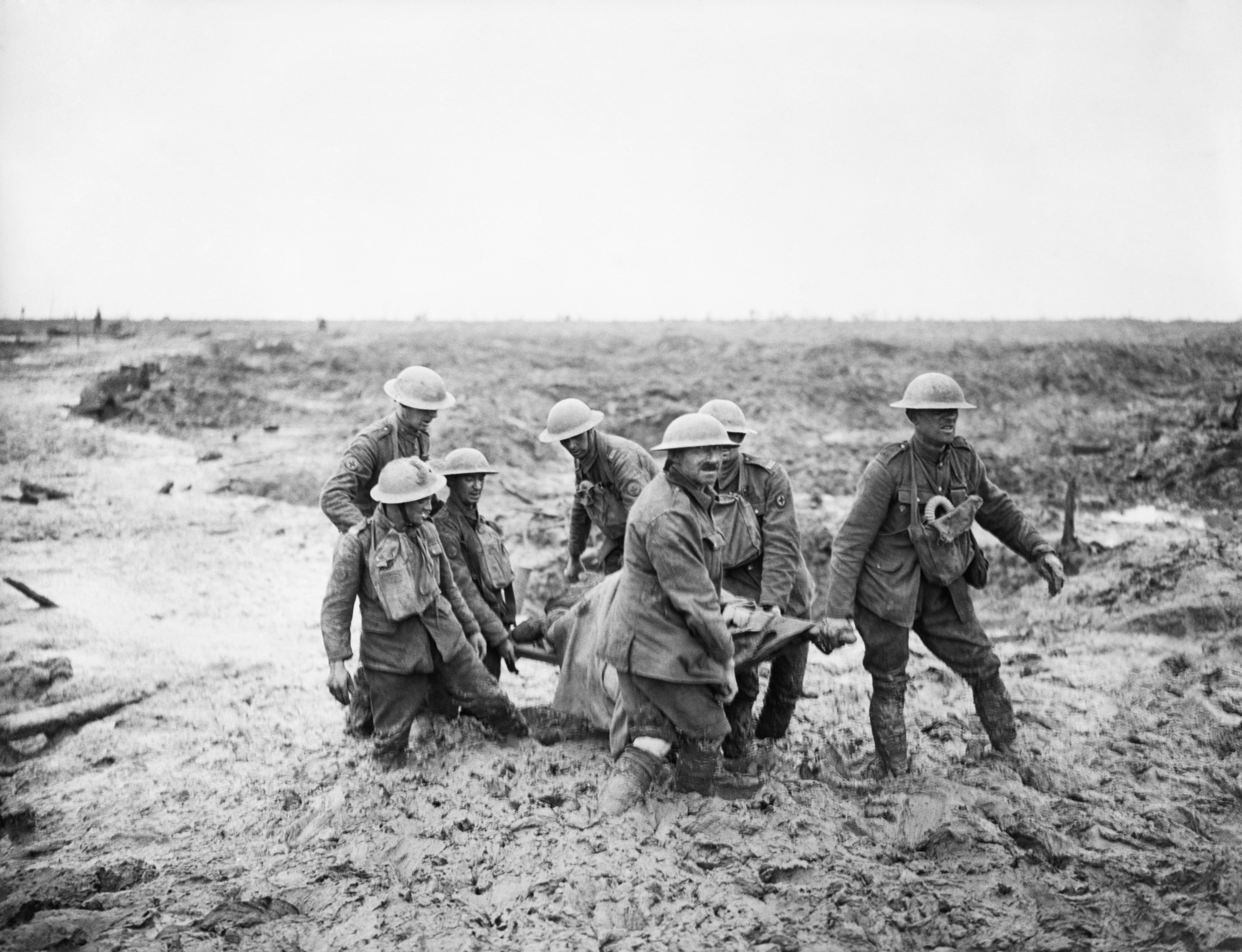
A team of stretcher-bearers struggling to evacuate a wounded man after the Battle of Pilckem Ridge.

The brigade took part in the following actions:

1916

- Battle of the Somme:
  - Fighting on the Ancre 3 September: 117th Bde was unable to complete the capture of the German positions and was forced to withdraw
  - Battle of Thiepval Ridge 26–28 September
  - Battle of the Ancre Heights 5 October–11 November
    - Capture of Schwaben Redoubt 14 October: 117th Bde assisted 118th Bde
    - Capture of Stuff Trench 21 October: 117th Bde carried out a subsidiary attack that gained some ground in the vicinity of 'Pope's Nose'
  - Battle of the Ancre 13–14 November: 117th Bde assisted in the capture of St Pierre Divion

1917

- Third Battle of Ypres:
  - Battle of Pilckem Ridge 31 July–2 August: 117th Bde successfully overran the German forward positions
  - Battle of Langemarck 16–18 August
  - Battle of the Menin Road Ridge 20–25 September: 117th Bde took its first two objectives, but was forced to form a defensive flank before it could complete its objectives, and suffered heavy casualties
  - Battle of Polygon Wood 26 September (in Divisional Reserve, not actually engaged)
  - Second Battle of Passchendaele 29 October–10 November

1918

- German spring offensive:
  - Battle of St Quentin 22–23 March: When the offensive began on 21 March 39th Division was in GHQ Reserve. Having moved up and dug in, 117th Bde was heavily attacked and carried out a fighting withdrawal
  - Actions at the Somme Crossings 24–25 March: 117th Bde covered the demolition of the bridges
  - Battle of Rosières 26–27 March: 117th Bde established a strong line but was compelled to withdraw after a breakthrough elsewhere; on 27 March it was cut off from 39th Divisional HQ for a while, and temporarily reorganised as a composite battalion under Lt-Col the Hon Edward Coke of 16th RB. The retreat continued on 28 March, but 39th Division then halted and made small-scale counter-attacks until relieved on 30/31 March

Each brigade was now hardly stronger than a single battalion, and the infantry of 39th Division was reorganised as '39th Composite Brigade'. 117th Brigade formed No 3 Battalion under Lt-Col Coke (16th RB) and A & B Companies of No 5 Battalion. The composite brigade then fought in the following actions with XXII Corps:

- Battle of the Lys (39th Division Composite Brigade):
  - Fighting on Wytschaete Ridge 16 April
  - First Battle of Kemmel Ridge17–19 April)
  - Second Battle of Kemmel Ridge 25–26 April: formed a defensive flank
  - Battle of the Scherpenberg 29 April: in corps reserve

=== Reorganisation ===
While the composite brigade was still in action, 39th Divisional HQ moved to Éperlecques, north-west of Saint-Omer. 39th Composite Bde was broken up and rejoined the division on 6 May. Following their crippling losses during the German spring offensive, the infantry brigades of 39th Division were withdrawn from active service. Their battalions were reduced to training cadres (TCs) and the TMBs broken up, the surplus personnel being drafted as reinforcements to other units. All three of 117th Bde's TCs were transferred to 197th Bde in 66th Division, and both 39th and 66th Divisions became holding formations for a number of TCs from other divisions. Over the following months 117th Bde had the following under its command:

- 11th (Service) Battalion, Cheshire Regiment – from 75th Bde, 25th Division, 23 June; disbanded 3 August
- 2/10th (Scottish) Battalion, King's (Liverpool Regiment) (Territorial Force) – from 172nd (2/1st South Lancashire) Bde, 57th (2nd West Lancashire) Division, 27 June; disbanded 3 August
- 4th Battalion, Lincolnshire Regiment (TF) – from 177th (2/1st Lincoln and Leicester) Bde 59th (2nd North Midland) Division; to 118th Bde 27 July
- 8th (Service) Battalion, KRRC – from 41st Bde, 14th (Light) Division, 27 June; disbanded 3 August
- 9th (Service) Battalion, KRRC – from 42nd Bde, 14th (L) Division, 27 June; disbanded 3 August
- 5th Battalion, North Staffordshire Regiment (TF) – from 176th (2/1st Staffordshire) Bde, 59th (2nd North Midland) Division; to 116th Bde 12 August
- 6th (Service) Battalion, Connaught Rangers – from 47th Bde, 16th (Irish) Division, 27 June; disbanded 3 August
- 8th (Service) Battalion, Rifle Brigade – from 41st Bde, 14th (L) Division, 27 June; disbanded 3 August
- 9th (Service) Battalion, Rifle Brigade – from 42nd Bde, 14th (L) Division, 27 June; disbanded 3 August
- 6th (Service) Battalion, Royal Munster Fusiliers – from 30th Bde, 10th (Irish) Division, 27 June; disbanded 3 August
- 2/5th Battalion, Sherwood Foresters (TF) – from 178th (2/1st Nottinghamshire and Derbyshire) Bde, 59th (2ndNM) Division 28 June; disbanded 3 August
- 5th Battalion, Durham Light Infantry (TF) – from 151st (Durham Light Infantry) Bde150th Bde, 50th (Northumbrian) Division, 16 August; demobilised 9 November
- 6th Battalion, Durham Light Infantry (TF) – from 151st (DLI) Bde, 50th (N) Division, 16 August; demobilised 6 November
- 8th Battalion, Durham Light Infantry (TF) – from 151st (DLI) Bde, 50th (N) Division, 16 August; demobilised 6 November

The 77th US Division had arrived at Éperlecques, and it began training under the guidance of the 39th Division TCs on 7 May. On 7 June 39th Divisional HQ moved to Wolphus, also near Saint-Omer, and over the next two months its TCs trained the 30th, 78th and 80th US Divisions in turn. In mid-August 39th Division moved to the French coast with 117th Bde at Rouen. On 1 November the division. was ordered to demobilise its remaining TCs, and this was completed before hostilities ended with the Armistice with Germany on 11 November. 117th Brigade was disbanded on 18 November, but 39th Division took over No 2 Line of Communication Reception Camp (for malarial convalescents) at Martin-Église, which was redesignated 117th Bde on 19 November. 39th Divisional HQ and its remaining subordinate units closed down on 10 July 1919.

== Commanders ==
The following officers commanded the brigade:

- Brig-Gen P. Holland, appointed 15 July 1915; sick 2–6 April 1916
- Lieutenant-Colonel E.B. Hales, acting 2–6 April
- Brig-Gen R.D.F. Oldman, appointed 15 April 1916
- Lt-Col C.H. Stepney, acting 5–9 March 1917
- Brig-Gen G.A. Armytage, appointed 9 March 1917
- Lt-Col A.P.H. Le Prevost (17th KRRC), acting 21 March 1918
- Lt-Col Hon E. Coke (16th RB) commanding 117th Bde Composite Battalion 27 March 1918
- Lt-Col C.C. Stapleden, acting 4–7 October 1918
- Brig-Gen Hon W.P. Hore-Ruthven, appointed 7 October 1918
- Brig-Gen C.W. Compton, appointed 17 October 1918
- Capt M.A. Ellissen, acting 6 November to disbandment 18 November 1918
- Brig-Gen T.S.H. Walsh (appointed to No 2 LofC Area Reception Camp 19 September 1918) from 19 November 1918 to demobilisation

== Insignia ==
39th Division's formation badge was a white square with three light blue vertical stripes. This was worn on the upper arm. Within 117th Bde, the battalions wore identifying signs in green (the traditional Facing colour of the Sherwood Foresters was Lincoln green while the two rifle regiments wore Rifle green dress uniforms) with black symbols superimposed. These were:

- 16th Sherwood Foresters – green horizontal rectangle with black horizontal bar
- 17th Sherwood Foresters (from November 1915) – green half oval (flat edge upwards) with black diamond (brown diamond from 1 September 1917)
- 17th KRRC (from 8 March 1916) – green half oval (flat edge downwards) with black square
- 16th Rifle Brigade – green half oval (flat edge downwards) with black Maltese cross
- 117th MG Company – green MGC badge shape with black skull and crossbones

== World War II ==
A new 117th Infantry Brigade Royal Marines was formed in the UK on 15 January 1945, with three Royal Marines battalions under command, and sent to carry out occupation duties in the naval base of Kiel after VE Day.
