= My Old Man =

My Old Man or my old man may refer to:

- One's father or husband

== Film and television ==
- My Old Man (film), a 1979 American television film based on a story by Ernest Hemingway (see below)
- My Old Man (2004 film), a Canadian short shown at the 2004 Toronto International Film Festival
- My Old Man (TV series), a 1970s British sitcom starring Clive Dunn
  - "My Old Man", the pilot episode of My Old Man, part of the Seven of One anthology series
- "My Old Man" (Scrubs), a television episode

== Literature ==
- "My Old Man" (short story), a 1923 story by Ernest Hemingway
- My Old Man, a 2004 novel by Amy Sohn
- My Old Man: A Personal History of Music Hall, a non-fiction book by John Major, about music halls

== Music ==
- My Old Man (album), a Steve Goodman tribute album, 2006
- "My Old Man" (Rodney Atkins song), 2002
- "My Old Man" (Zac Brown Band song), 2017
- "My Old Man (Said Follow the Van)" or "Don't Dilly Dally on the Way", a 1919 music hall song, or a football chant based on it
- "My Old Man", a song by Anika Moa from In Swings the Tide, 2007
- "My Old Man", a song by Ian Dury from New Boots and Panties!!, 1977
- "My Old Man", a song by Joni Mitchell from Blue, 1971
- "My Old Man", a song by Mac DeMarco from This Old Dog, 2017
- "My Old Man", a song by Steve Goodman
- "My Old Man", a song by the Walkmen from Bows + Arrows, 2004

== See also ==
- Under My Skin (1950 film), a 1950 film based on Hemingway's story
- Old man (disambiguation)
- This Old Man
