= Babuška =

Babuška or Babuska may refer to:

- 36060 Babuška, an asteroid
- Ivo Babuška (1926–2023), a Czech-American mathematician
- Babuska, a minor character in a 2020 comedy Borat Subsequent Moviefilm

== See also ==
- Babushka (disambiguation)
