= Babushka =

Babushka or baboushka or babooshka (from Russian: ба́бушка, IPA: [ˈbabʊʂkə], meaning 'grandmother, elderly woman') may refer to:

== Arts and media ==
- "Babooshka" (song), 1980, by Kate Bush
- Babushka (game show), a British game show presented by Rylan Clark-Neal
- Babushka (about 1935), a painting by Gladys Goldstein

== People ==
- Babushka Lady, an unknown woman who might have photographed the events of the President John F. Kennedy assassination
- Catherine Breshkovsky nicknamed Babushka (1844–1934), Russian revolutionary

== Other uses ==
- Babushka (headscarf), indicating a headscarf tied below the chin, as commonly worn in rural parts of Europe
- Babushka doll, an alternate name for Matryoshka doll, a type of wooden dolls placed one inside another
- Babushka Adoption Foundation, a charitable non-governmental organization based in Bishkek, Kyrgyzstan

== See also ==
- Babuška (disambiguation)
