= Der Alte =

Der Alte ("the old man" in German) may refer to:

- Der Alte (television series), a German crime drama series
- Konrad Adenauer (1876–1967), nicknamed "Der Alte", first Chancellor of West Germany
- A nickname for the U-boat commander in the 1981 West German war film Das Boot

== See also ==
- Old man (disambiguation)
