= Battle of Pilckem Ridge =

1917 battle

- Part of the Battle of Passchendaele on the Western Front of the First World War
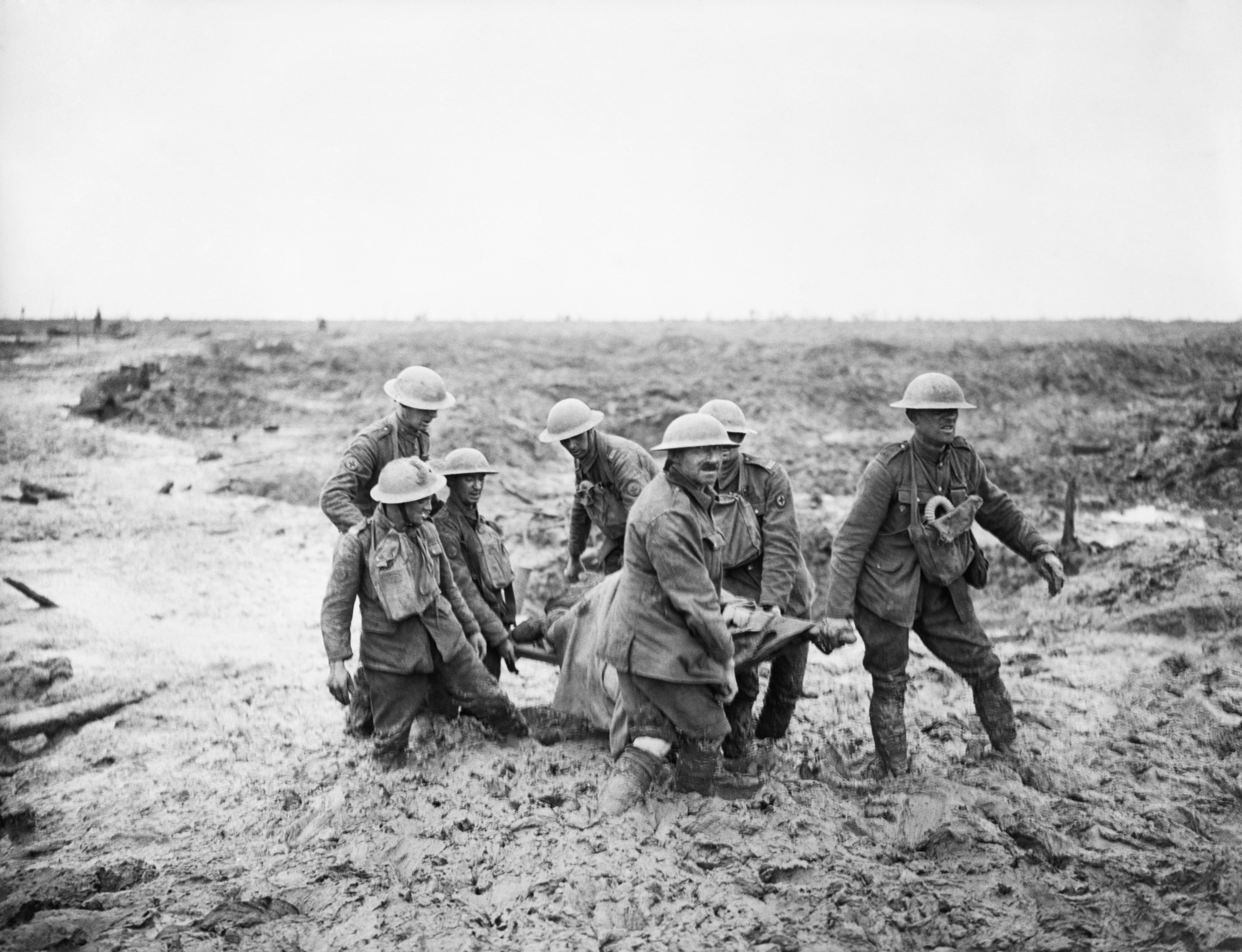
- British stretcher bearers carrying a wounded man over deep mud near Boesinghe
Date	31 July – 2 August 1917
Location	Ypres Salient, Belgium 50°55′N 02°55′E
Result	Anglo-French victory

Belligerents
British Empire; United Kingdom; New Zealand; France	Germany

Commanders and leaders
Douglas Haig; Hubert Gough; Herbert Plumer; François Anthoine	Erich Ludendorff; Crown Prince Rupprecht; Friedrich Sixt von Armin

Strength
13 divisions	7 divisions

Casualties and losses
British (31 July – 3 August): 31,820; French (26–30 July): 500 (31 July): 1,300 (180 killed)	21–31 July: c. 30,000; 31 July: 5,626 (POW)

The Battle of Pilckem Ridge (31 July – 2 August 1917) was the opening attack of the Third Battle of Ypres in the First World War. The British Fifth Army, supported by the Second Army on the southern flank and the French 1^{re}Armée (First Army) on the northern flank, attacked the German 4th Army, which defended the Western Front from Lille northwards to the Ypres Salient in Belgium and on to the North Sea coast. On 31 July, the Anglo-French armies captured Pilckem (Flemish: Pilkem) Ridge and areas on either side, the French attack being a great success. After several weeks of changeable weather, heavy rain fell during the afternoon of 31 July.

In the XIX Corps area in the centre and on the right of XVIII Corps, three reserve brigades advanced from the black line to the main objective (green line) and pressed on towards the red line, the furthest that exploitation on local initiative had been allowed for in the plan. It began to rain, cutting off the advanced British troops from view, just as German regiments from specialist Eingreif (counter-attack) divisions advanced over Passchendaele Ridge. To avoid being rolled up, the reserve brigades retreated, suffering many casualties, through the green line to the black line, which the British artillery-observers could still see; the German infantry were prevented from advancing further by massed artillery and small-arms fire.

A substantial amount of ground had been captured by the British and French, except on the Gheluvelt Plateau on the right flank, where only the blue line (first objective) and part of the black line (second objective) were captured. A large number of casualties were inflicted on the German defenders during the attack and 5,626 prisoners were taken; the German Eingreif divisions recaptured some ground from the Ypres–Roulers railway northwards to St Julien, forcing the British back to the black line. For the next few days, both sides made local attacks to improve their positions, much hampered by the deluges. The rains had a serious effect on operations in August, causing more problems for the British and French, who were advancing into the area devastated by artillery fire and partly flooded by the unseasonable rain.

A local British attack on the Gheluvelt Plateau on 2 August was postponed several times because of the weather until 10 August and the second big general attack, due on 4 August, did not begin until 16 August. The green line objectives on the Plateau were not captured until the Battle of the Menin Road Ridge on 20 September, after the principal role in the offensive was transferred to the Second Army and three weeks' sunshine and fresh breezes dried much of the ground. The Third Battle of Ypres became controversial while it was being fought, with disputes about the predictability of the August deluges and for its mixed results, which in much of the writing in English is blamed on apparent misunderstandings between Gough and Haig and on faulty planning, rather than on the resilience of the 4th Army.

== Background ==
=== Strategic background ===
Operations in Flanders, Belgium had been desired by the British Cabinet, Admiralty and War Office since 1914. In January 1916, Haig ordered General Henry Rawlinson to plan an attack in the Ypres Salient. The need to support the French army during the Battle of Verdun 21 February – 18 December 1916 and the demands of the Somme battles 1 July – 18 November 1916, absorbed the offensive capacity of the British for the rest of the year. Marshal Joseph Joffre was replaced as the French Commander-in-Chief by General Robert Nivelle in December, who planned a breakthrough offensive by the French armies on the Western Front during the spring of 1917, to return to a war of manoeuvre and a decisive victory. The Nivelle Offensive began on 9 April with the British Battle of Arras, followed on 16 April by the French Second Battle of the Aisne. The British attack was a big success but the French plan to defeat decisively the Westheer (German army in the west) was a strategic failure. Morale in the French armies collapsed, mutinies occurred and Nivelle was replaced by General Philippe Petain.

While the French recuperated, offensive action on the Western Front could only come from the BEF and in June 1917, the principle of a Flanders campaign was reluctantly approved by the British War Cabinet. On the French sector, Petain intended to maintain an active defence and planned three limited Batailles de Redressement (battles of recovery) lavishly to be supported with artillery, aircraft and manpower, sufficient to guarantee success and restore morale. In early June, at about the same time as the British attack on Messines Ridge, the Sixth Army would attack on the Aisne front. In Flanders, the First Army (General François Anthoine) was to participate in the British Flanders offensive and in mid-July, the Second Army would attack at Verdun, as the main Flanders offensive began. In early June, the crisis in the French armies led to the postponement of the Sixth Army attack on the Chemin des Dames but during June and July, the concentration of the First Army north of Ypres continued.

=== British plans 1916–1917 ===
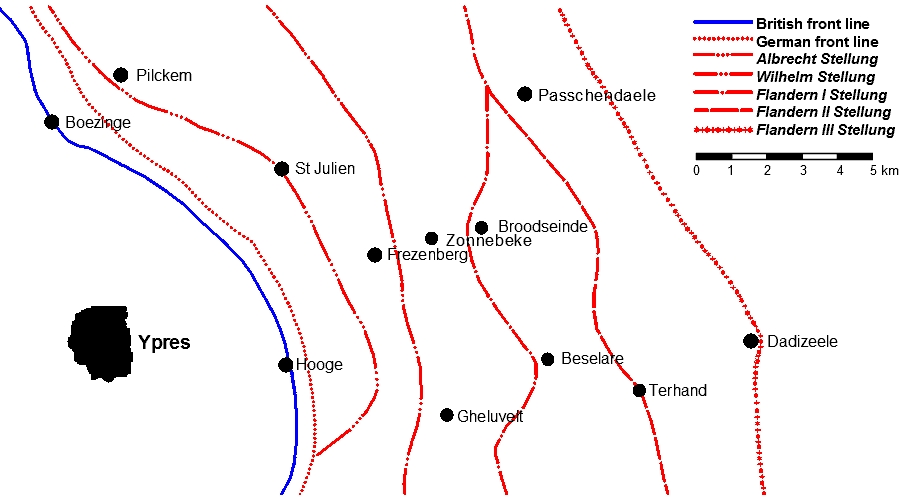
The British front line and the German defences in the area east of Ypres, mid-1917

In late 1916, the Second Army commander, General Herbert Plumer was ordered to plan an attack out of the Ypres Salient but Haig was dissatisfied with the limited scope of the plan to capture Messines Ridge and Pilkem Ridge further north. In early 1917, Haig calculated that the Nivelle Offensive would force the Germans out of Belgium or that the 4th Army in Flanders would give up divisions to reinforce the armies further south. Plumer revised the plan to capture Messines and Pilckem ridges and advance onto the Gheluvelt Plateau; a later attack would capture the Plateau, Passchendaele and beyond. The plan required 35 divisions and 5,000 guns, far more artillery than the BEF possessed.

At General Headquarters (GHQ) Colonel George Macmullen proposed to capture the Gheluvelt Plateau with a massed tank attack but a reconnaissance in April, found that narrow defiles between three woods on the Plateau and broken ground obstructed the approaches. Tanks would have to detour north of Bellewaarde lake to Westhoek, then wheel right at the Albrechtstellung. Plumer produced another plan to take Messines Ridge and the west end of the Gheluvelt Plateau, followed by the capture of Pilckem Ridge. The Fourth Army commander, General Henry Rawlinson, proposed to take Messines Ridge first, then the Gheluvelt Plateau and Pilckem Ridge within 47 to 72 hours.

On 14 February, Macmullen submitted the GHQ 1917 plan and on 7 May, Haig set 7 June for the attack on Messines Ridge, the Flanders offensive to begin some weeks later. A week after the Battle of Messines Ridge, Haig informed the army commanders that the strategy was to wear down the 4th Army, secure the Belgian coast and advance to the Dutch frontier. Passchendaele Ridge was to be taken and the advance continued to Roulers (Roeselare) and Thourout, to cut the Bruges (Brugge) to Kortrijk railway that supplied the 4th Army from Ypres to the Belgian coast. Once the railway was cut, the Fourth Army would attack along the coast, combined with an amphibious landing (Operation Hush) in support of the main advance, along with the Belgian army in between. On 13 May, Haig appointed General Hubert Gough to command the Flanders offensive and Macmullen gave Gough the GHQ 1917 plan.

== Prelude ==
=== Allied preparations ===
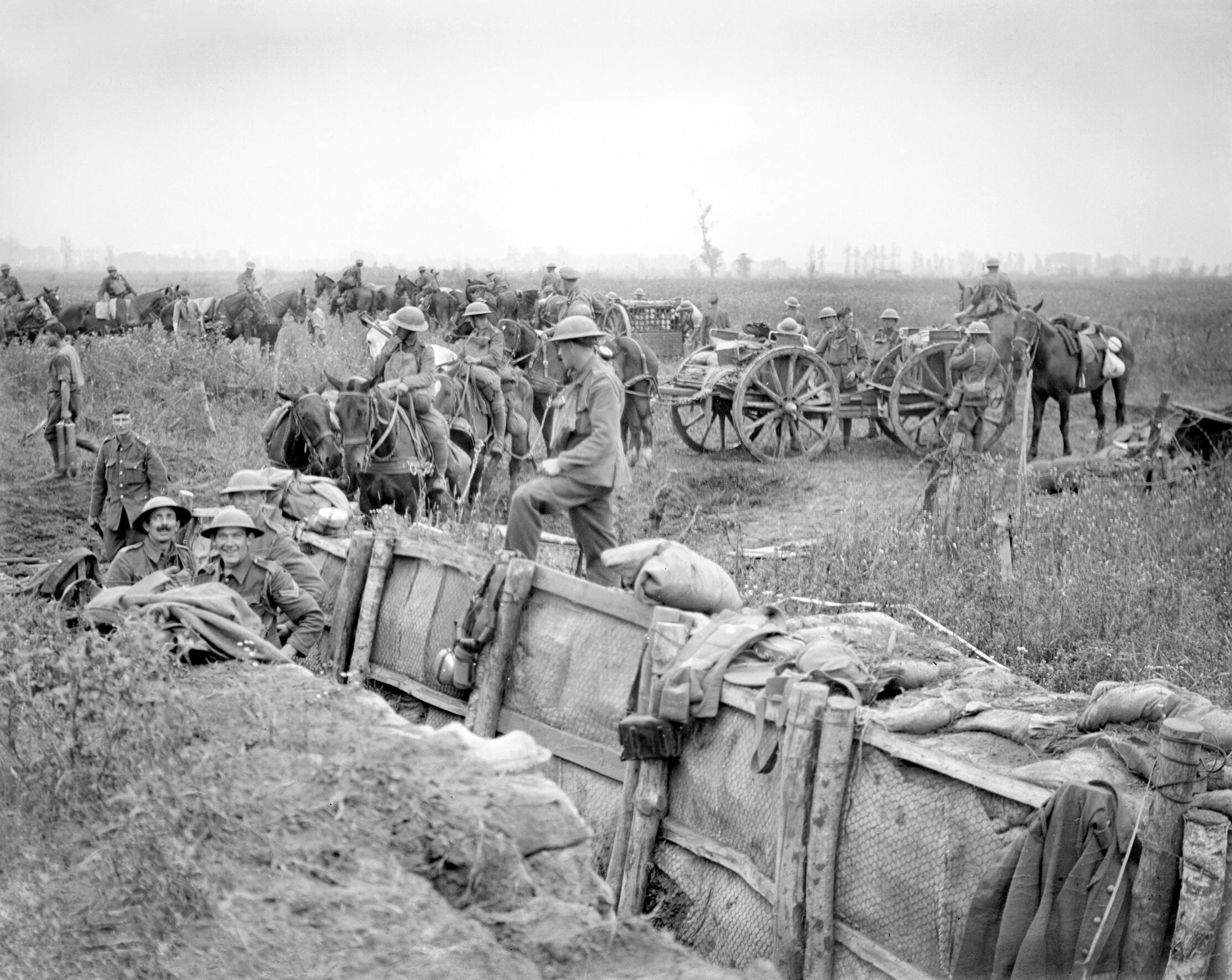
British 18-pounder field gun battery near Boesinghe, taking up new positions, 31 July

Gough met the corps commanders in June and the third objective of the GHQ 1917 plan, including the German Wilhelmstellung (third position) was added to the first day objectives. A fourth objective (red line) was added as the limit of advances that could be made on local initiative if the German defence collapsed in places. Five divisions from the Second Army, nine divisions and a brigade of the Fifth Army and two divisions from the French First Army were to attack. A preparatory bombardment was planned from 16 to 25 July and the Second Army was to capture outposts in the Warneton line, to simulate an advance beyond Messines Ridge and stretch the German defence. The Fifth Army was to attack along a 14,000 yd (8.0 mi; 13 km) front from Klein Zillebeke northwards to the Ypres–Staden railway, the French I Corps on the northern flank attacking with two divisions, from the Fifth Army boundary to the flooded area just beyond Steenstraat. Infantry trained on a replica of the German trench system, built using information from aerial photographs and trench raids; some platoons had specialist training for attacking pillboxes and blockhouses.

The Flandern I Stellung (fourth position), was 10,000–12,000 yd (5.7–6.8 mi; 9.1–11.0 km) behind the front line, well beyond the fourth objective (red line). Behind Flandern I Stellung were Flandern II Stellung and Flandern III Stellung. In his Operation Order to the corps commanders of 27 June, Gough gave the green line as the main objective and that patrols of fresh troops were to probe towards the red line, to exploit any German disorganisation or collapse. The plan was more ambitious than the plan devised by Plumer for an advance of 1,000–1,750 yd (910–1,600 m) on the first day and Major-General John Davidson, the BEF Director of Operations, complained of "ambiguity as to what was meant by a step-by-step attack with limited objectives". Davidson suggested an advance of no more than 1,500 to 3,000 yd (0.85 to 1.70 mi; 1.4 to 2.7 km), to increase the concentration of British artillery-fire. Gough replied that temporarily undefended ground should be occupied, which was more likely in the first attack, with its longer preparation than later attacks; after discussions at the end of June, Haig endorsed the Fifth Army plan.

==== Aerial preliminaries ====
Weather 26–30 July
Date	Rain mm	°F
26	—	75
27	—	75
28	—	78
29	11.5	69
30	0.5	65

A planned slow build-up of Allied air activity over the Ypres Salient was changed to a maximum effort after a weather delay on 11 July, due to the effectiveness of the reply by the Luftstreitkräfte. The Germans had been sending larger formations into action and on 12 July, a record amount of air activity occurred. Thirty German fighters engaged Royal Flying Corps (RFC) and French fighters of the Aéronautique Militaire in a dogfight lasting an hour, the RFC losing nine aircraft and the Luftstreitkräfte fourteen. The Germans resisted the British and French air effort until the end of July, when their losses forced a change to more defensive tactics. On 1 July, the opening attack was postponed at the request of Anthoine as the French needed more time to prepare artillery emplacements. On 7 July, Gough asked for another postponement of five days; some British heavy artillery had been lost to the German counter-bombardment, some had been delayed and bad weather had hampered the programme of counter-battery fire. Haig agreed to delay until 28 July and then Anthoine requested another postponement because the poor weather had slowed his artillery preparation. After Gough supported Anthoine, Haig reluctantly agreed to wait until 31 July, despite endangering Operation Hush, which had to catch the high tides from 7 to 8 August; a delay might force a postponement for a month.

=== Allied plan ===
The set-piece attack was to begin with an advance by the Second Army on the right towards the Warneton line (Wilhelmstellung) with parts of five divisions to red, blue and green lines (objectives) on a 9,100 yd (5.2 mi; 8.3 km) front. The Fifth Army was to advance through the German front position, the Albrechtstellung (second position) and Wilhelmstellung (third position) to the blue, black and green objective lines, which were about 1,000, 2,000 and 3,500 yd (0.57, 1.14 and 1.99 mi; 0.91, 1.83 and 3.20 km) distant, at any of which a halt could be called depending on German resistance. Patrols from the reserve brigades were to advance towards the red line (fourth objective) 1,000–1,500 yd (910–1,370 m) further on, at the discretion of divisional commanders, if the German defence opposite had collapsed. The Fifth Army had 752 heavy guns and 1,442 field guns, with support from the 893 guns and mortars of the French First Army on the northern flank and 322 guns of X Corps in the Second Army to the south. Gough also intended to use 120 Mark IV tanks to support the attack, with another 48 in reserve. Gough had five cavalry divisions and a cavalry brigade was to be deployed if XIV Corps reached its objectives. (Note: Ground conditions were so bad that only 19 tanks reached the German second position.)

The preliminary bombardment was to destroy German strong points, trenches and cut barbed wire; counter-battery fire was to suppress the 4th Army artillery. The first wave of British infantry would advance under a creeping barrage moving at 100 yd (91 m) every four minutes, followed by troops advancing in columns or in artillery formation (organised in a lozenge-shape, as seen from above) . British intelligence predicted that the Albrechtstellung would be the main line of resistance and that infantry would not be counter-attacked unless their advance reached it, except on the Gheluvelt Plateau, where the Germans were expected to counter-attack at once, given the importance of its commanding ground to both sides. II Corps faced the Gheluvelt Plateau and was given closer objectives than the other corps, only 1,000 yd (910 m) forward at Klein Zillebeke in the south and 2,500 yd (2,300 m) at the junction with XIX Corps, on the Ypres–Roulers railway to the north.

II Corps had five divisions, unlike the other Fifth Army corps, which had four each, two for the attack and two in reserve. Three II Corps divisions and a brigade from the 18th (Eastern) Division, would attack supported by about 43 per cent of the Fifth Army artillery, plus the artillery of X Corps on the northern flank of the Second Army. Twelve brigades of field artillery supported each division, bringing the artillery support available to II Corps to approximately 1,000 guns. Gough allocated a disproportionate amount of the Fifth Army artillery to II Corps for 31 July, compared to the other corps, with an average of 19 per cent of the Fifth Army artillery each. The green line from the southern flank of XIX Corps, through XVIII Corps to the northern flank of XIV Corps and the French I Corps area required an advance of 2,500–3,500 yd (1.4–2.0 mi; 2.3–3.2 km).

==== French (northern) flank ====
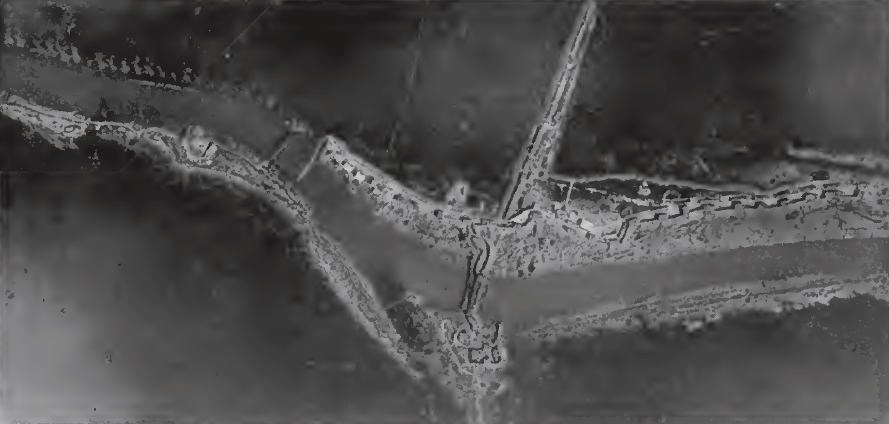
Drei Grachten bridgehead, Flanders, 1917

The French 1^{re} Armée (First Army, Général François Anthoine) comprised I Corps (Lieutenant-General Paul Lacapelle) and XXXVI Corps (Lieutenant-General Charles Nollet). The French had two hundred and forty 75 mm field guns, 277 trench artillery pieces (mostly 58 mm mortars), 176 heavy howitzers and mortars, 136 heavy guns and 64 super-heavy guns and howitzers, twenty-two being 305 mm or larger, making 893 guns and mortars for 4.3 mi (7 km) of front. (Note: I Corps: 1st Division, 2nd Division, 51st Division and 162nd Division; XXXVI Corps: 29th Division and 133rd Division. The I Corps divisions, whose troops were mainly recruited from northern France, had suffered many casualties in the Nivelle Offensive but had rested from 21 April until 20 June. The XXXVI Corps divisions had garrisoned the North Sea coast since 1915 and had not been involved in the mutinies.) The French relieved the Belgian divisions along the front from Boesinghe to Nordschoote (Noordschote) from 5 to 10 July. From Boesinghe north to Steenstraat, the front line ran along the canal and no man's land was 200–300 yd (180–270 m) wide; further north the land had been under water since the Belgian inundations during the Battle of the Yser in 1914.

A paved road between Reninghe, Nordschoote and Drie Grachten (Three Canals) ran on a bank just above the water and the Kemmelbeek, Yperlee, Yser Canal and Martjevaart/St Jansbeck emptied into the floods. At Maison du Passeur the French had an outpost over the canal, connected by a footbridge. From the Maison du Passeur pillbox to Nordschoote, no man's land was wide and mostly flooded. The Germans had built parapets and breastworks, since digging was impossible and there were no concrete artillery-observation posts, which left the position vulnerable to attack. I Corps was to form the northern flank of the attack, by crossing the tongue of land between the Yser Canal and the floods at the Martjevaart/St Jansbeek stream as far as Poesele, south of Noordshoote. The first objective was over difficult going to the second of two German lines east of the Yser Canal and the second objective was the German third line further back. The advance was to follow a creeping barrage moving at 300 ft (90 m) in four minutes, with pauses to keep the French and British barrages level.

=== German defences ===
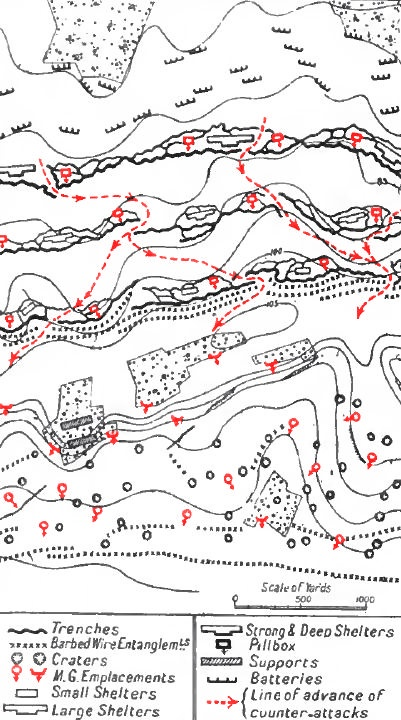
German defensive system, Flanders, mid-1917

The 4th Army operation order for the defensive battle was issued on 27 June. The German defences had been arranged as a forward zone, main battle zone and rearward battle zone. The front system had three breastworks about 200 yd (180 m) apart, garrisoned by the four companies of each front battalion, with listening-posts in no man's land. About 2,000 yd (1.1 mi; 1.8 km) behind these works was the Albrechtstellung (second position) the artillery protective line marking the rear boundary of the forward zone. Dispersed in front of the Albrechtstellung were divisional sharpshooter machine-gun nests and half of the companies of the support battalions were in the pillboxes of the Albrechtstellung.

The Albrechtstellung was the front of the main zone with the Wilhelmstellung (third position) a further 2,000 yd (1.1 mi; 1.8 km) behind at the rear of the main zone, which contained most of the field artillery. The reserve battalions of the regiments in the front position held the pillboxes of the Wilhelmstellung. The rearward zone between the Wilhelmstellung and Flandern I Stellung, contained the support and reserve assembly areas for the Eingreif divisions. After the German failures at Verdun in December 1916 and at Arras in April 1917, when the forward zones had been overrun and the garrisons lost, these areas became more important. The main defensive engagement was expected to be fought in the main battle zone, against attackers who had been depleted and delayed by the forward garrisons, with reinforcements from the Eingreif divisions ready to engage if necessary.

The Germans planned a rigid defence of the front system and forward zone, supported by counter-attacks. Elastic defence, which allowed local withdrawals, was rejected by Fritz von Loßberg, the new 4th Army Chief of Staff, because they would disorganise troops moving forward to counter-attack. Front line troops were to evacuate shelters as soon as the battle began and move forward or to the flanks, to avoid British artillery-fire and to counter-attack. Some machine-gun nests and permanent garrisons were separate from the counter-attack organisation, to provide a framework for the defence in depth to be re-established once the counter-attack had succeeded. Thirty-six MG08/15 machine-guns had recently been added to each regiment, which gave the infantry more firepower to cover movement. The Luftstreitkräfte had about 600 aircraft in the 4th Army area, 200 being single-seat fighters; eventually eighty German air units operated over the Flanders front.

== Battle ==
=== Second Army ===
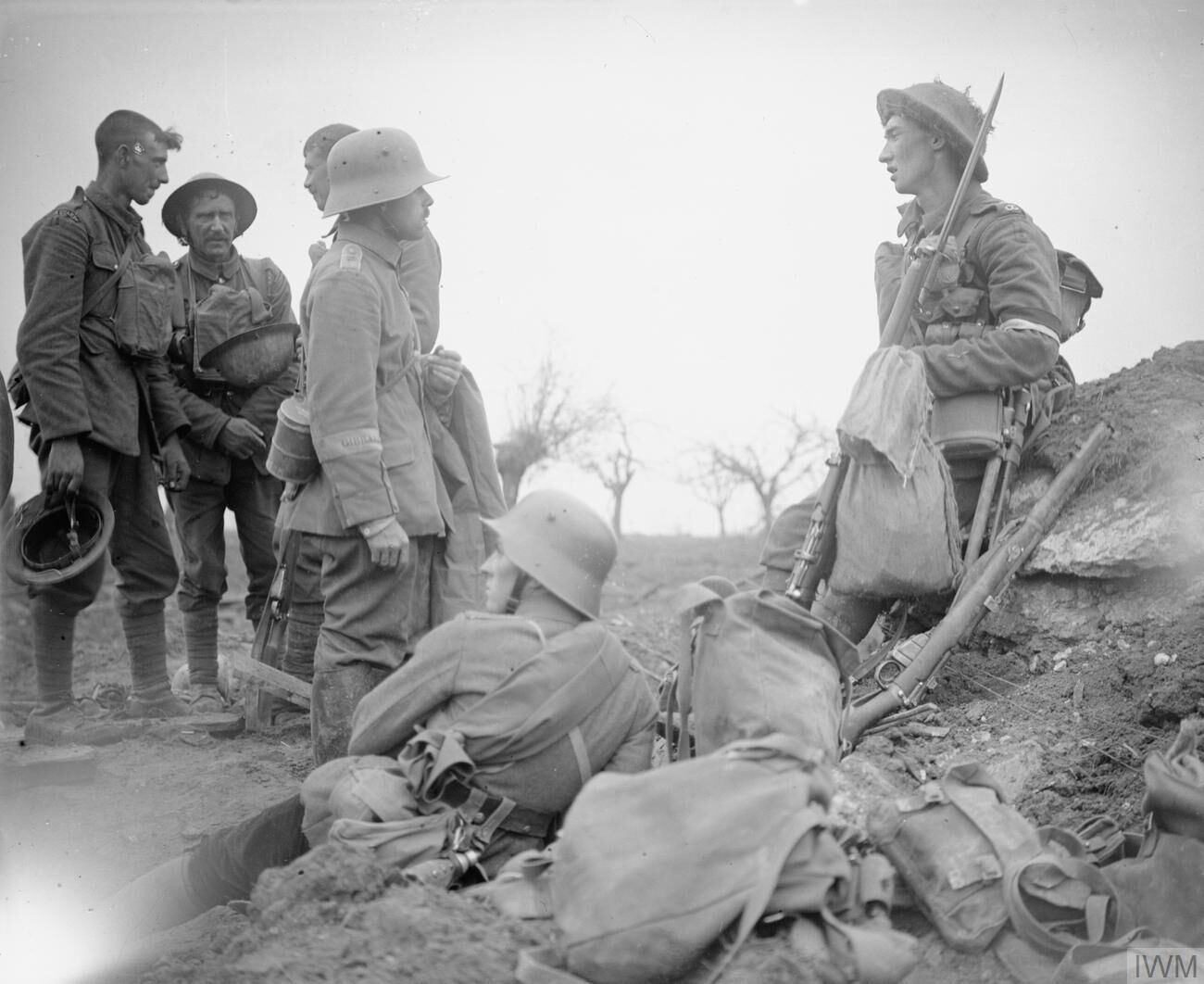
British soldiers guarding German prisoners, 31 July 1917

Mist and unbroken cloud with a base from 500 to 800 ft (150 to 240 m) high, meant that it was still dark when the British bombardment began at 3:50 a.m. Due to the excellent observation possessed by the Germans, 3:50 a.m. had been chosen for zero hour when the British, advancing from the west, would be able to see for about 200 yd (180 m); German troops would be looking westwards into darkness. The barrage stood for six minutes while the British infantry crossed the 200–300 yd (180–270 m) of no man's land and assembled, then the barrage began to creep forward at 100 yd (91 m) in four minutes. The attack extended from opposite Deûlémont in the Second Army area, north to the boundary with the Fifth Army, against the Warneton–Zandvoorde line to simulate a threat against Lille. The ground was muddy after rain on 29 July and a drizzle began on 31 July before the attack. II Anzac Corps on the right took the German outpost line west of the Lys (now Leie) river. The New Zealand Division captured La Basseville, south-west of Warneton, after street fighting with the garrison, which eventually withdrew towards Warneton; the 3rd Australian Division captured outposts and strong points near Gapaard, east of Messines.

In IX Corps, the 37th Division and the 19th (Western) Division advanced 500 yd (460 m) on either side of the Wambeke and Roosebeke streams, past Oosttaverne and the spur between, towards the blue line (first objective) 1,000–1,500 yd (910–1,370 m) forward. The 19th (Western) Division attacked from Bee Farm in the south to Forret Farm in the north, with two battalions of the 37th Division attached to the right flank, to capture the blue line from July to Bee Farms, then revert to the 37th Division, to advance south of July Farm. The 19th (Western) Division attacked with the 56th Brigade, three battalions to attack and one in reserve. The attacking battalions assembled in the front line and the support battalion in the old British front line behind Messines Ridge, moving into the front-line after zero hour. The attack was supported by the 19th divisional artillery, the left group of the 37th divisional artillery, two 6-inch batteries of corps heavy artillery, plus a barrage from about 30 machine-guns. The right battalion reached the objective very quickly, capturing Junction Buildings, Tiny and Spider farms; the 63rd Brigade battalions of the 37th Division formed a defensive flank by 4:10 a.m. and one gained touch with the rest of the division on the right but a gap 300 yd (270 m) was left between Wasp Farm and Fly Buildings. Further to the left, a battalion of the 19th (Western) Division reached the blue line but further on, companies of the battalion to the left was pushed back near Forret Farm. German prisoners claimed to have been surprised by the early zero hour; mopping up and consolidation began in the dark.

At about 5:30 a.m., German artillery-fire increased and troops were seen dribbling forward near Pillegrem's Farm, on the left flank of the 37th Division. Engineers and pioneers had begun consolidating despite the German barrage and by 11:00 a.m. Tiny Farm had been fortified and communication trenches dug back to the old front line. More Germans were seen dribbling forward, small arms fire increased and at 6:40 a.m., a smoke screen rose at the junction of the 19th (Western) and 37th divisions. A German counter-attack began at 7:40 a.m. and parties of the 63rd Brigade on the right flank were overrun, only a few getting back to Tiny Farm. Reinforcements from the 19th (Western) Division were prevented from reaching the old front line by German machine-gun fire. More reserves arrived and defensive flanks were formed until a counter-attack on Rifle Farm began at 8:00 p.m. The Farm was captured then lost again. A second attack in the north on Forret Farm was repulsed late in the day and the 19th (Western) Division was ordered to consolidate.

Much of the X Corps artillery helped the Fifth Army with counter-battery fire on German artillery behind Zandvoorde, as the 41st Division attacked either side of the Ypres–Comines Canal. Some German pillboxes had been built in columns, backwards from the front-line, whose machine-gunners kept up a steady fire. The strong points on the left were quickly suppressed but those on the right held out for longer and caused many casualties, before German infantry sallied from shelters between the front and support lines on the right flank. The Germans were repulsed by rifle fire and a Vickers machine-gun fired by the battalion commander. Mopping-up the remaining pillboxes failed, due to casualties and a shortage of ammunition. It began to rain and at 4:00 a.m. Germans were seen massing for a counter-attack. Reinforcements were called for and rapid fire opened on the German infantry but the attack reached the un-captured pillboxes on the right. The British artillery replied as infantry reinforcements arrived, the Germans were forced back and the last pillboxes captured. The 41st Division had advanced about 600–650 yd (550–590 m) on a 2,500 yd (1.4 mi; 2.3 km) front, taking Hollebeke in the south and Klein Zillebeke, beyond Battle Wood. Another advance waited on II Corps to the north.

=== Fifth Army ===
==== II Corps ====
Weather 31 July – 10 August
Date	Rain mm	°F	
31	21.7	69	dull
1	5.3	59	—
2	5.3	59	—
3	9.9	59	—
4	4.9	66	dull
5	0.0	73	fine
6	0.1	71	dull
7	0.0	69	dull
8	10.2	71	dull
9	0.2	68	fine
10	1.5	69	fine

The main British effort was made by II Corps across the Ghelveult Plateau, on the southern flank of the Fifth Army. II Corps had the most difficult task, advancing against the principal German defensive concentration of artillery, Stellungsdivisionen (ground-holding divisions) and Eingreif (specialist counter-attack) divisions. The 17th Brigade on the right of 24th Division reached its objective 1,000 yd (910 m) east of Klein Zillebeke but the 73rd Brigade in the centre was stopped by fire from German pillboxes at Lower Star Post. The 72nd Brigade on the left reached the Bassevillebeek, then had to withdraw to a line south from Bodmin Copse, a few hundred yards short of the blue line (first objective).

The 30th Division with four attached battalions of the 18th (Eastern) Division, had to advance across the Gheluvelt plateau to Glencorse Wood. The 21st Brigade on the right lost the barrage as it struggled through the wreckage of Sanctuary Wood and took until 6:00 a.m. to capture Stirling Castle Ridge. Attempts to press on were stopped by German machine-gun fire. The 90th Brigade on the left was stopped on the first objective. German artillery-fire fell on Sanctuary Wood and Chateau Wood from 5:00 a.m. and stopped the advance, except for 300 yd (270 m) south of Westhoek.

In the dark, a 30th Division battalion veered left and crossed the Menin road north of a dogleg in the road, rather than to its south. When the battalion advanced slightly north of east as planned, the mistake led it into Château Wood to the north and it reported that it had captured its objective, Glencorse Wood to the east. The attached battalions of the 53rd Brigade of the 18th (Eastern) Division, moved forward across the Menin road expecting the ground to be undefended and it was not until 9:00 a.m. that the mistake was discovered by the divisional commanders. The 53rd Brigade troops spent the rest of the day attacking an area that the 30th Division battalion thought it had taken. The 30th Division and 24th Division failed to advance far due to the boggy ground, loss of direction in the dark and because many German machine-guns remained intact.

Map of the 8th Division attack at Ypres on 31 July 1917.

The 8th Division advanced towards Westhoek and took the Blue and Black lines relatively easily. The southern flank then became exposed to German machine-gun fire from Nonne Boschen and Glencorse Wood, opposite the 30th Division. The failure of the 30th Division further south was unknown to the 8th Division until just before the 25th Brigade was due to advance over Westhoek Ridge. Brigadier-General Clifford Coffin decided that it was too late to stop the attack and sent a company of the reserve battalion to fill the gap to the south but this did not prevent German enfilade fire. The 25th Brigade consolidated on the reverse slope and held the crest with Lewis-gun posts. Pockets of ground lost to German hasty counter-attacks (Gegenstoße) were regained by more British attacks and artillery-fire defeated later German attacks.

==== XIX Corps ====
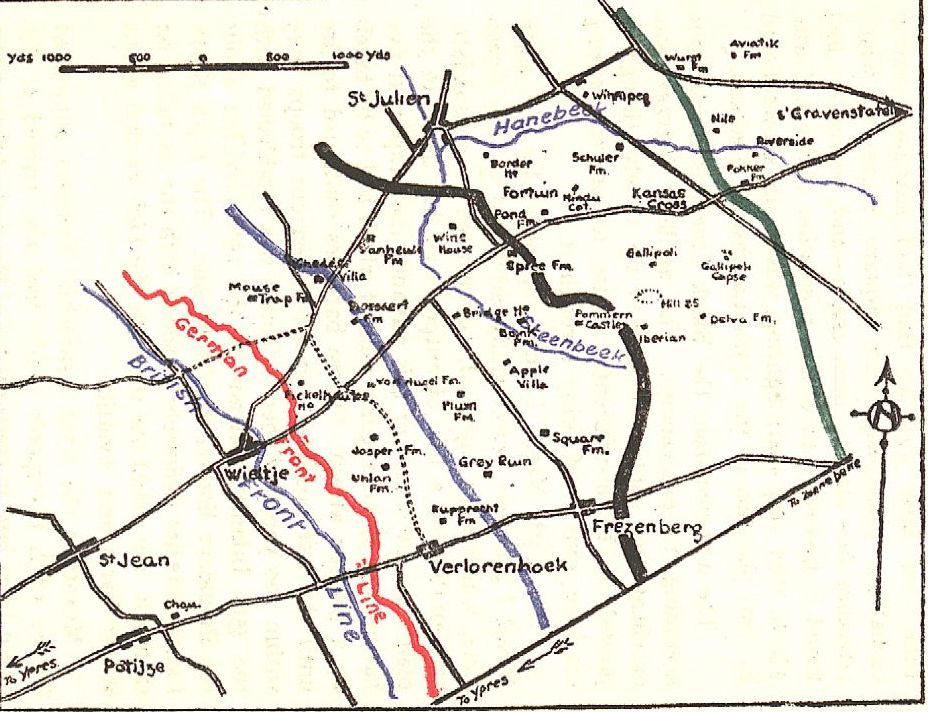
Objectives of the 55th (West Lancashire) Division during the Battle of Pilckem Ridge

XIX Corps attacked with the 15th (Scottish) Division on the right, next to the II Corps boundary along the Ypres–Roulers railway and 55th (West Lancashire) Division on the left, northwards to the outskirts of St Julien. The black line was on Frezenberg Ridge and the green line was along the far side of the Steenbeek valley. If the Germans collapsed, reserve brigades were to advance towards the red line beyond Gravenstafel. The advance began well but resistance from fortified farms caused delays; several tanks managed to get forward and attack strong-points including Bank Farm and Border House, allowing the advance to continue.

After a pause to consolidate on the black line, the reserve brigades advanced to the green line a mile beyond. The sun came out and a mist rose; on the right beyond the Ypres–Roulers railway, enfilade fire was received from the area not captured by the 8th Division. The 164th Brigade of the 55th (West Lancashire) Division, had to fight through many German strong-points but took Hill 35 and crossed the Wilhelmstellung (third position), an advance of about 4,000 yd (2.3 mi; 3.7 km). Patrols pressed on beyond the Zonnebeek–Langemarck road and a platoon took fifty prisoners at Aviatik Farm on the Gravenstafel spur.

==== XVIII Corps ====
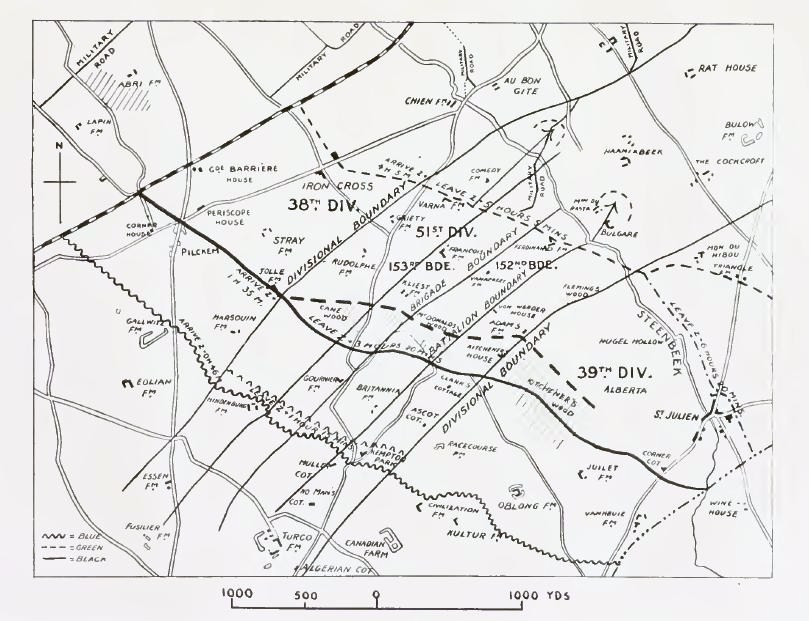
39th and 51st Division advances towards the Steenbeek, 31 July 1917

The 39th Division advanced at zero hour and its 116th Brigade captured St Julien and took 222 prisoners, supported by two tanks, which then silenced an artillery battery nearby. On the left of the division, the 117th Brigade rushed three pillboxes at Kansas Cross, killed the machine-gunners and took several prisoners. Two tanks advanced on the Alberta strong point, flattened uncut wire and kept the garrison under cover as the infantry advanced. At the first objective, the infantry pausing for an hour and then moved down a slope, behind a smoke and shrapnel barrage, to the Steenbeek, one of the muddiest parts of the battlefield. By 8:00 a.m. both brigades had reached the final objective and were digging in on the east side of the Steenbeek.

A battalion of the 3rd Guard Division was relieving Infantry Regiment 392 when the attack began and the 51st (Highland) Division troops found many Germans in shell holes to take prisoner. The 152nd Brigade, on the right, captured McDonald's Farm. A volley of rifle grenades was fired inside and a tank fired from the right, which caused the survivors to surrender; 70 prisoners, a howitzer and two machine-guns were captured. A tank suppressed the garrison of Ferdinand Farm and routed infantry from shell-hole positions nearby. As the Scots reached the Steenbeek, machine-gun fire from 60 yd (55 m) beyond the opposite bank caused the cancellation of the plan to form a bridgehead at Maison du Rasta. On the left flank, the 153rd Brigade met resistance from Cane Wood and Rudolphe Farm which caused many casualties before they were overrun and 70 prisoners taken. Delays were met at François Farm and a strong point in a cemetery but around 10:30 a.m., outposts had been established on the rise beyond the Steenbeek. Both divisions dug in along the river for 3,000 yd (1.7 mi; 2.7 km) from St Julien northwards to the Pilckem–Langemarck road.

==== XIV Corps ====
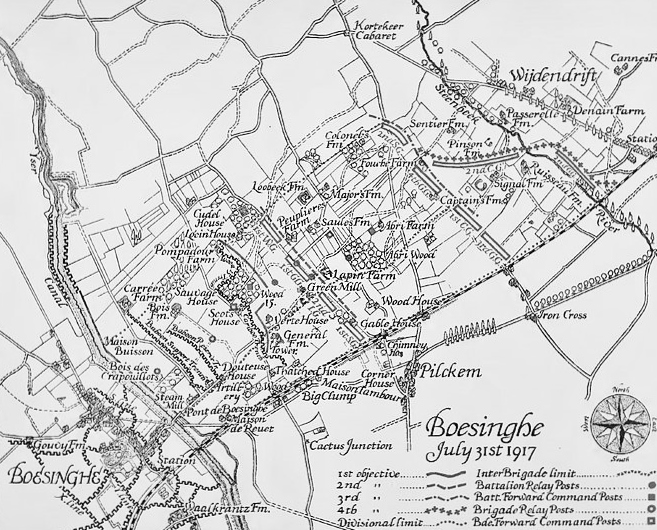
Guards Division advance on Weijdendreft, 31 July 1917

In the XIV Corps area, the Guards Division, on the left flank, had crossed the Yser Canal on the afternoon of 27 July after a reconnaissance report from British airmen. The German front position was empty and the Guards lurked forward for 500–700 yd (460–640 m) beyond, with the French 1st Division conforming on the left. The 38th (Welsh) Division line on the right was already on the east side of the canal and encountered German small-arms and artillery-fire when it pressed forward. A regiment of the German 23rd Reserve Division was sent forward that evening to recapture the front line. The British bombardment was so intense that only one battalion was able to counter-attack. On 31 July, the British and French advanced 3,000–3,500 yd (1.7–2.0 mi; 2.7–3.2 km) to the Steenbeek River. The preliminary bombardment had destroyed the German front position and the creeping barrage supported the infantry at least as far as the first objective. Infantry and a few tanks dealt with German strong points further on, penetrated the forward battle zone and pushed on. Several field batteries were brought forward once the black line had been captured, joining the masked batteries placed there before the attack. Cavalry probes began but German artillery and small-arms fire stopped them short of the green line.

=== 1^{re} Armée (First Army) ===
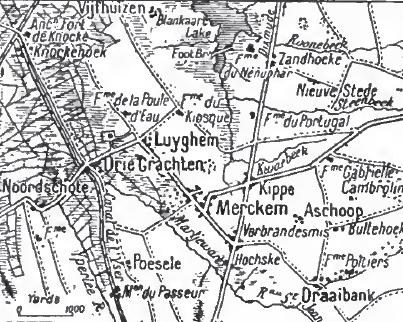
Inundations at Drei Grachten, Flanders, 1917

By dawn on 30 July, the 1st and 51st divisions of the 1^{re} Armée had relieved the 2nd and 162nd divisions under the cover of a gas bombardment, which increased in intensity as dawn approached and suppressed the German artillery. The canal was bridged downstream of Het Sas and mats were laid upriver for the attacking battalions, which moved up at the last minute and passed through the support battalions in the front line. On the east bank, the infantry moved round Bois 14 and Hangar Wood, ferme du Puits, House fort, Vauban fort, maison de la Relève, le Casque, Diagonal Trench and the southern approaches of Terminal 8, protected by outposts established on the east bank since 28 July. At 3:50 a.m. on 31 July, under a thick overcast sky, I Corps attacked on a 3,000 yd (1.7 mi; 2.7 km) front with the 1st Division on the right and the 51st Division on the left. The French used 39 bridges thrown over the Yser Canal since the crossing on 27 July. The German first line north to Steenstraat was taken easily and then the advance began on the second position.

French machine-gun companies fired an overhead barrage from the B Line 550 yd (500 m) west of the canal, on woods behind the German second position, Coquelicot (Poppy) Trench, Kortekeer, Smiske Cabaret (tavern), Bixschoote and the objectives at Stampkot Trench, Smiske Cabaret and around the Steenstraat–Langewaade road. No German machine-guns fired on the French as they advanced and the German artillery fired no more than five or six shells per minute on each divisional front. The quantity of German artillery-fire gradually increased on the right of the 51st Division and on the Yser Canal. The 1st Division on the right flank reached the first objective at ferme Charpentier and ferme Hangar by 5:40 a.m. On the left, the 51st Division reached Casque Trench, Pigeonnier (loft) Trench and Stampkot Trench with few casualties. Around 5:45 a.m., the supporting battalions advanced towards the second objective north of Bois 15 and past the north-east edge of Triangle Wood and ferme Cheurot, arriving before 7:00 a.m. German artillery barrages on Triangle Wood and machine-gun fire on the right flank of the 1st Division caused more casualties. From 7:15 a.m., the battalions in divisional reserve sent reconnaissance parties forward towards Moulin Bleu crossroads, Kortekeer Trench and Abris crossroads, that quickly reached their objectives.

The reserve battalions leap-frogged the troops at the second objective and attacked towards the third objective, against determined resistance from pillbox and blockhouse garrisons; machine-gunners in the remains of concrete shelters fired from close range, which held up the battalion on the right flank of the 1st Division and pinned down a battalion of the 51st Division on the left flank at Bixschoote blockhouse. German artillery began to bombard Kortekeer Trench and by 9:00 a.m., the French advance had been slowed. Near Poesele to the north, the German infantry made several ineffectual counter-attacks and the French also received intermittent artillery- and machine-gun fire. At about 10:00 a.m., reports arrived from French contact patrol aircraft that the 1st Division had reached battery position 54.86, ferme Chaune and ferme Tilleul and that 51st Division troops were at Cheurot Wood, Abris crossroads, Poesele, Smiske Cabaret and ferme Chapelle sud. By 11:00 a.m., the 51st Division held a line from Coquelicot Trench to the south of Bixschoote, which was entered by patrols at about 10:30 a.m. Several prisoners were taken, two battalions occupied the village and a line from Moulin Bleu crossroads to ferme Cuirassiers, north-east of the village.

Two batteries of 75 mm field guns and one of 105 mm guns crossed the canal over the bridge at Steenstraat and the British got 24 guns over the canal. Three artillery groups of the 74th Division and two of the 51st Division dug in north of Boesinghe and at 10:15 a.m., the guns annihilated German troops massing for a counter-attack on the right of the 1st Division, north of Kortekeer Trench, after being spotted by French aircrew. By 1:30 p.m., the 1st Division had advanced beyond the final objective, level with the 51st Division at Bixschoote to a line from ferme Cuirassiers, points 48.92 to 48.94 and Kortekeer Cabaret. Next to the Guards Division, the advance was held up around ferme du Colonel but on the left flank, infantry of the 51st Division could be seen sheltering behind demolished breastworks. The sky had cleared around 2:00 p.m. and recognition flares were seen at several captured farmhouses. Aircrews gave warning of a counter-attack being prepared near Bixschoote which was repulsed at 5:00 p.m.

I Corps had reached a line from Gouverneur Trench to Smiske Cabaret, around Bixschoote, ferme Cuirassiers (the divisional boundary) maison Ecossais and the battery position at point 54.86. After patrols from the 51st Division pushed northward and found no Germans near Poesele, Anthoine ordered I Corps to advance to a line from the Martjewaart cutting to the Saint-Jansbeek and Broenbeek streams, to create a defensive zone between Drie Grachten and the confluence of the Corverbeek. The advance took ground useful for an attack on the right flank, over the Corverbeek between Draaibank and Zevekoten, to the southern edge of Houthulst Forest. Many new French positions consisted of craters half-full of water, which dissolved when connected. Contact with the rear was difficult over the shattered landscape but the infantry had been issued supplies for four days. The German 2nd Guard Reserve Division advanced through Houthoulst Forest towards the junction of the Fifth and First armies but the attack bogged down in deep mud. A prisoner said that of his company of about 150 men, barely fifty reached attacking distance and most of those took cover in shell-holes. The next four days were exceptionally rainy, which added to the difficulty of supplying the new front line.

=== Air operations ===
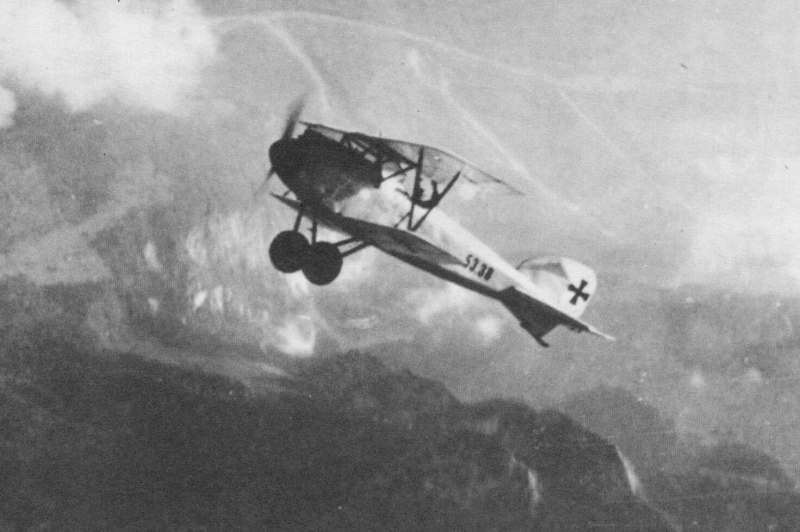
Example of an Albatros D III

On 26 July, thirty-seven RFC fighter aircraft engaged fifty Albatros scouts near Polygon Wood but four German reconnaissance aircraft slipped over the line and reconnoitred. Next evening, eight British aircraft over Menin lured about twenty Albatros scouts into an ambush over Polygon Wood by fifty-nine fighters. Aircraft in the vicinity joined in and after an hour had shot down nine German aircraft, for an RFC loss of two aircraft; the German survivors withdrew. On 27 July, a RFC reconnaissance report enabled XIV Corps to occupy 3,000 yd (1.7 mi; 2.7 km) of the German front position. Next day in fine weather, the British conducted a large amount of air observation for counter-battery fire and detected German batteries which had been moved.

Flying was curtailed by poor weather on 29 and 30 July. By 31 July, the Allies had concentrated 840 aircraft from the Lys River to the sea, 330 being fighters. The French contributed three Groupes de Chasse (fighter groups) including Groupe de Combat 12 (Les Cigognes) two bomber, three artillery-observation squadrons and seven balloons. The air plan was cancelled because of thick, unbroken low cloud but a few pilots went up to freelance and some contact-patrol pilots flew very close to the ground to observe the ground battle; thirty British aircraft were damaged by bullets and shells.

=== German 4th Army ===
At noon the advance on the II Corps front had been stopped by the German ground holding divisions and their artillery. News of the arrival of the British on the green line further north, 500 yd (460 m) beyond the Steenbeek on the XIX Corps front at about 11:00 a.m. took a long time to reach the British divisional headquarters, because mist obstructed visual signalling, runners were slowed by the heavy going and signal cables were cut. Contact-patrol crews reconnoitring the new front line found the British troops unwilling to light flares while overlooked from German defences. Around 3:00 p.m., Gough ordered all XIX Corps troops to advance to the green line to support the three fresh brigades there. Delays persisted and a German force approaching from behind the Broodseinde–Passchendaele ridge was not seen by British aircraft. A message from a ground observer did not reach the 15th (Scottish) Division headquarters until 12:53 p.m. and rain began soon after, cutting off British artillery observers from view of the British troops furthest forward.

At 2:00 p.m., a German creeping barrage began along XIX Corps front then German troops attacked the flanks of the most advanced British positions. The 39th Division on the left was pushed back to St Julien, exposing the left flank of the 55th (West Lancashire) Division, just as it was attacked frontally over the Zonnebeke spur by six waves of German infantry, preceded by a barrage and three aircraft which bombed and machine-gunned the British troops. Attempts to hold the ground between the black and green lines failed due to the communication breakdown, the speed of the German advance and worsening visibility as the rain increased during the afternoon. The 55th (West Lancashire) and 15th (Scottish) Division brigades beyond the black line were rolled up from north to south and were either overrun or retreated. It took until 6:00 p.m. for the Germans to reach the Steenbeek, where the downpour added to the mud and flooding in the valley. When the Germans were 300 yd (270 m) from the black line, the British stopped the advance with artillery and machine-gun fire.

The success of the British advance in the centre of the front was a shock to the German commanders. The defensive system was designed to delay an attacker and create the conditions for an encounter battle advantageous to the defenders, not the 4,000 yd (2.3 mi; 3.7 km) advance achieved by XIX and XVIII Corps. Regiments of the German 221st Division and 50th Reserve Division from Group Ypres (Gruppe Ypern) near Passchendaele had begun a counter-attack from 11:00 to 11:30 a.m. The three advanced British brigades were depleted, unevenly spread and out of touch with their artillery due to the rain and smoke shells in the German creeping barrage. The German infantry drove the British back from the green line along the Zonnebeke–Langemarck road, the XIX Corps brigades retreating to the black line. The Germans recaptured St Julien just west of the green line on the XVIII Corps front, where the counter-attack was stopped by mud, artillery and machine-gun fire. The three British brigades had suffered 70 per cent casualties by the time they reached the black line.

German counter-attacks on the flanks had little success. In the XIV Corps area, German attacks made no impression against dug in British troops but managed to push back a small bridgehead of the 38th (Welsh) Division from the east bank of the Steenbeek, after the German infantry had suffered many casualties from British artillery during their advance around Langemarck. The Guards Division, north of the Ypres–Staden railway, held its ground; the French repulsed German counter-attacks around St Janshoek and followed up the repulse to capture Bixschoote. German counter-attacks in the afternoon against II Corps on the Gheluvelt Plateau, to recapture Westhoek Ridge, got forward a short distance from Glencorse Wood before the 18th (Eastern) Division artillery and a counter-attack pushed them back again. In the Second Army area, south of the plateau at La Basse Ville, a powerful counter-attack at 3:30 p.m. was repulsed by the New Zealand Division. X Corps also managed to hold its gains around Klein Zillibeke against a big German attack at 7:00 p.m.

== Aftermath ==
=== Analysis ===
On 4 August, Haig told the Cabinet that the attack was a success and that casualties had been low for such a big battle, 31,850 suffered from 31 July to 2/3 August, compared to 57,540 losses on 1 July 1916. An advance of about 3,000 yd (1.7 mi; 2.7 km) had been achieved in the centre and north. German observation areas on the highest part of the Gheluvelt Plateau near Clapham Junction and the ridge from Bellewaarde to Pilckem had been captured, nine German divisions had been "shattered" and hurriedly relieved by the first echelon of Eingreif divisions. The reliefs of the ground holding divisions implied that fresh divisions had replaced them, beginning the process of drawing German divisions to Flanders, away from the bulk of the French armies. An unusually large number of German dead were counted and more than 6,000 prisoners had been taken along with 25 guns. The nine Fifth Army divisions had been intended to gain the green line, possibly up to parts of the red line and then be capable of pressing on to the Passchendaele–Staden Ridge before needing to be rested. The green line had been reached in the north but only part of the black line on the Gheluvelt Plateau, at a cost of 30 to 60 per cent casualties and about half of the tanks knocked out or bogged down.

The defensive power of the Eingreif divisions had been underestimated and the attacking divisions, having easily advanced for 1 mi (1.6 km) in three hours, had been exposed to observed machine-gun and artillery-fire for the rest of the day; most of the British casualties were suffered after the advance had been completed. The postponements of the attack prolonged the preliminary bombardment to six days and wet ground, particularly in the Bassevillebeeek, Hanebeek and Steeenbeek valleys had become crater-fields that flooded in rain. The German guns behind the Gheluvelt Plateau had been most effective against the artillery of the II and XIX corps, firing high-explosive and mustard gas shells, which caused many casualties to the British gunners, who could not be rested during the preparatory period; the British fired a record amount of ammunition but had to distribute it as far back as Flandern I Stellung, where its effect was wasted. (Note: Major-General Hugh Trenchard, commander of the RFC, wrote to the ground commanders in August that a study of low-flying attacks on German troops concluded that the effect was short-lived, though highly demoralising for the victims and equally stimulating to friendly infantry in the vicinity. Trenchard wrote that such attacks would have best effect when co-ordinated with ground operations. Trenchard emphasised that the infantry should be told that much of the air effort took place out of sight and that absence of British aircraft over the battlefield should not be taken for inactivity. Rain continued until 5 August and seriously interrupted artillery observation sorties.) The French official historians wrote in 1937 that the artillery preparation had been most effective and that as the French I Corps troops advanced swiftly over devastated ground, morale soared as they saw that even the largest German concrete blockhouses and strong points had been destroyed. The French attack recovered most of the ground lost in the German gas attack of 22 April 1915.

In 1996, Prior and Wilson wrote that the French First Army, XIV Corps, XVIII Corps and XIX Corps advanced about 3,000 yd (1.7 mi; 2.7 km), took two German defensive positions and deprived the Germans of their observation posts on Pilckem Ridge, a "substantial achievement" despite the later repulse of the XVIII and XIX corps from the areas of the green and red lines. II Corps on the Gheluvelt Plateau had only advanced about 1,000 yd (910 m) beyond the Albrechtstellung but took Bellewaarde Ridge and Stirling Castle. The training of the Fifth Army troops had enabled them to use Lewis guns, rifle grenades, trench mortars and tanks to overwhelm German pillboxes, when the artillery had managed to neutralise the defenders of a sufficient number of blockhouses in advance. Casualties were about the same, unlike 1 July 1916 when the British had only inflicted a few thousand on the Germans. The Fifth Army captured about 18 sq mi (47 km^{2}) on 31 July compared to only 3.5 sq mi (9.1 km^{2}) on the First day of the Somme.

The German defensive success on the Gheluvelt Plateau left the British in the centre open to enfilade-fire from the right, contributing to the greater number of losses incurred after the advance had stopped. Gough was criticised for setting objectives that were too ambitious, causing the infantry to lose the barrage and become vulnerable to the German afternoon counter-attacks. Prior and Wilson wrote that the failure had deeper roots, since successive attacks could only be spasmodic as guns were moved forward, a long process that would only recover the ground lost in 1915. This was far less than the results Haig had used to justify the offensive, in which great blows would be struck, the German defences would collapse and the British would be able safely to advance beyond the range of supporting artillery to the Passchendaele and Klercken ridges, then towards Roulers, Thourout and the Belgian coast. The German counter-bombardments had been effective and their Eingreif divisions had not crumpled, leaving open only the possibility of a slow tactical success, rather than a strategic triumph.

In 2008, J. P. Harris called the attack on 31 July a remarkable success compared to 1 July 1916, with only about half the casualties and far fewer fatalities, inflicting about the same number on the Germans. Interrogations of prisoners convinced Haig that the German army had deteriorated. The relative failure on the Gheluvelt Plateau and the repulse in the centre from the red line and parts of the green line by German counter-attacks did not detract from this, several counter-attacks having been defeated. Had the weather been dry during August, the German defence might have collapsed and the geographical objective of the offensive, the re-capture the Belgian coast, might have been achieved. Much rain fell on the afternoon of 31 July and the rain in August was unusually severe, having a worse effect on the British, who had more artillery and a greater need to get artillery-observation aircraft into action in the conditions of rain and low cloud. Mud paralysed manoeuvre and the Germans were trying to hold ground rather than advance, an easier task regardless of the weather.

=== Casualties ===
In 1931, Hubert Gough wrote that 5,626 prisoners had been taken on 31 July. The British Official History recorded Fifth Army casualties 31 July – 3 August as 27,001, of which 3,697 were fatal. Second Army casualties (31 July – 2 August) were 4,819, 769 being fatalities. The 19th (Western) Division suffered 870 casualties. In 1937, the French official historians recorded a maximum of 1,800 First Army casualties from 26 to 31 July, about 1,300 suffered on 31 July, of whom 180 men were killed. In 2014, Elizabeth Greenhalgh recorded 1,300 French casualties in I Corps. The 4th Army suffered casualties for the ten-day accounting period 21 to 31 July of c. 30,000. James Edmonds, the British official historian, added another 10,000 lightly wounded to the total, to make casualty totals comparative, a practice which has been questioned ever since. According to Albrecht von Thaer, the chief of staff of Gruppe Wijtschate, units which survived physically no longer had the mental ability to continue.

== Subsequent operations ==
=== Southern flank ===
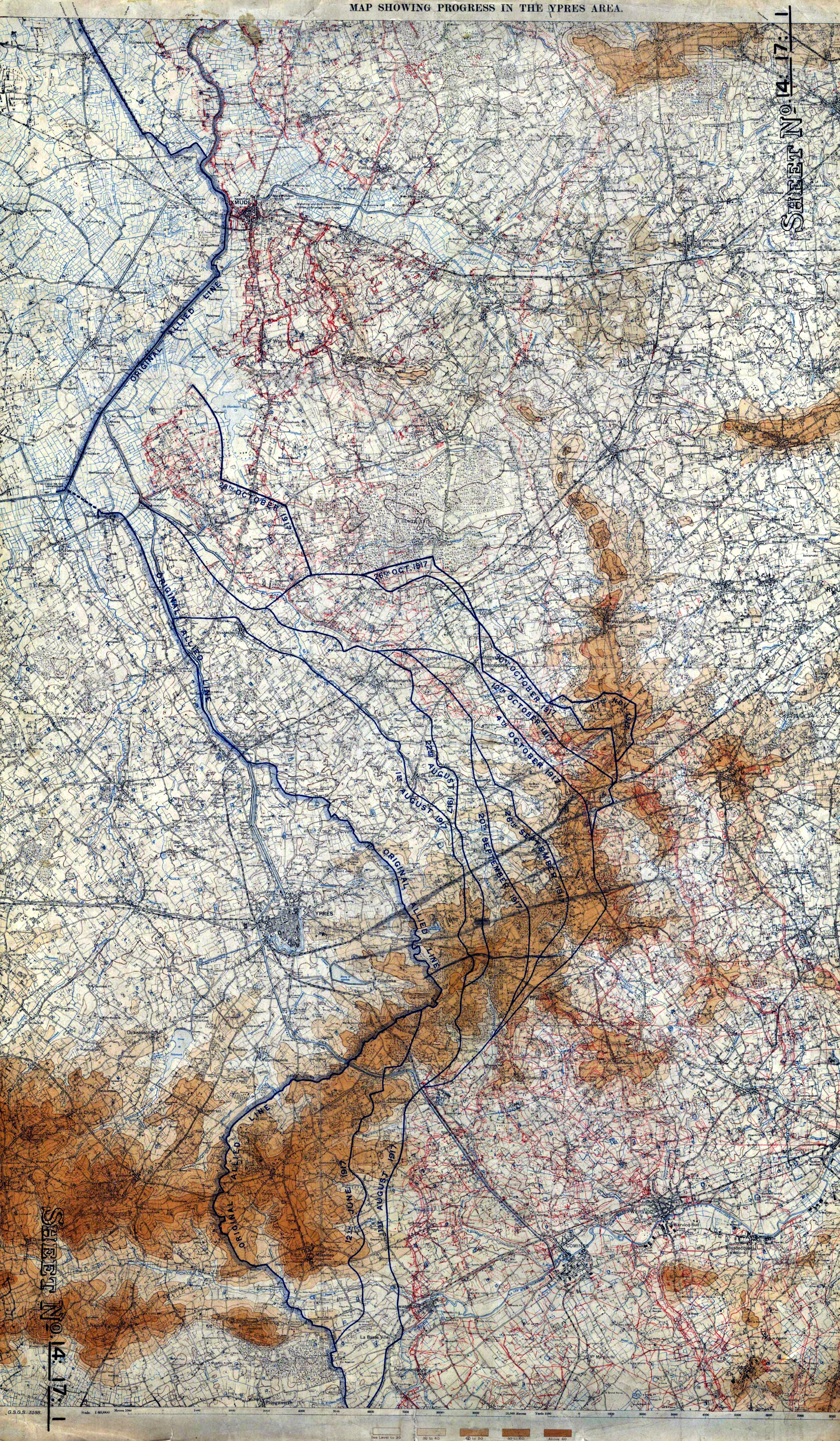
Third Ypres – map showing the Allied advance in the Ypres area.

On the Second Army front, German artillery kept up a constant bombardment on the new British front line, which with the rain, caused the British great difficulty in consolidating the captured ground. In the Second Army area, on 1 August, a German counter-attack on the front of the 3rd Australian Division, reached the Warneton Line before being stopped by artillery and machine-gun fire. An attack by the 19th (Western) Division and the 39th Division on 3 August, to regain the portion of the first objective (blue line) was cancelled when a battalion occupied the ground unopposed. The 41st Division captured Forret Farm on the night of 1/2 August and the 19th (Western) Division pushed observation posts forward to the blue line.

==== Operation Summer Night ====
Operation Summer Night (Unternehmen Sommernacht) was a German methodical counter-attack (Gegenangriff) near Hollebeke, in the Second Army area on the southern flank, which began at 5:20 a.m. on 5 August. The 22nd Reserve Division had been relieved by the 12th Division and the 207th Division, after its losses on 31 July. After a short bombardment, three companies of I Battalion, Infantry Regiment 62 of the 12th Division captured a slight rise 0.62 mi (1 km) north-east of Hollebeke, surprising the British, who fell back 260 ft (80 m). The new German positions were on higher and drier ground and deprived the British of observation over the German rear, reducing casualties from British artillery-fire.

Further to the south, Reserve Infantry regiments 209 and 213 of the 207th Division attacked Hollebeke through thick fog and captured the village, despite many casualties, taking at least 300 prisoners. Most of the British were in captured pillboxes and blockhouses, which had to be attacked one by one. At 5:45 a.m., three signal flares were fired to indicate success. The Germans later abandoned Hollebeke and reoccupied the old "A line", then withdrew to their start line because of the severity of British counter-attacks and artillery-fire. Sommernacht left the front-line ragged, with a 1,300 ft (400 m) gap between regiments 209 and 213. The British tried to exploit the gap, which led to attack and counter-attack before the bigger British attack of 10 August against the Gheluvelt Plateau.

=== Centre ===
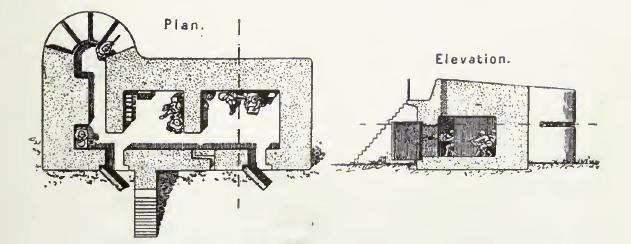
Plan view of a German pillbox, Flanders 1917

On 1 August, a German counter-attack on the Fifth Army front, at the boundary of the II and XIX Corps, managed to push back the 8th Division for a short distance south of the Ypres–Roulers railway. North of the line, the 15th (Scottish) Division stopped the attack with artillery-fire. Two battalions of the 8th Division counter-attacked and restored the original front line by 9:00 p.m. On the afternoon of 2 August, the Germans attacked again on the 15th (Scottish) and 55th (West Lancashire) Division fronts in XIX Corps and were repulsed from the area around Pommern Redoubt. A second attempt at 5:00 p.m. was "crushed" by artillery-fire, the Germans retiring behind Hill 35. German troops reported in Kitchener's Wood opposite the 39th Division in the XVIII Corps area were bombarded, St Julien was re-occupied and posts established across the Steenbeek north of the village; more advanced posts were established by the 51st (Highland) Division on 3 August.

A German attack on 5 August recaptured part of Jehovah Trench from the 24th Division in II Corps, before being lost again the next day. On 7 August, the Germans managed to blow up a bridge over the Steenbeek, at Chien Farm in the 20th (Light) Division (XIV Corps) area. On the night of 9 August, the 11th (Northern) Division (XVIII Corps) took the Maison Bulgare and Maison du Rasta pillboxes unopposed and pushed posts another 150 yd (140 m) beyond the Steenbeek. An attempt by the 11th (Northern) Division to gain more ground was stopped by fire from Knoll 12. The 29th Division (XIV Corps) took Passerelle Farm and established posts east of the Steenbeek, building twelve bridges across the river. The neighbouring 20th (Light) Division inched forward on 13 August and on 14 August took Mill Mound and four reinforced concrete infantry shelters (Mannschafts–Eisenbeton–Unterstände, MEBU). The British had to dig in short of the Au Bon Gite blockhouse and repulsed a German counter-attack the next day.

==== Capture of Westhoek ====
The Gheluvelt Plateau was a sea of mud, flooded shell craters, fallen trees and barbed wire. Troops were quickly tired by rain, mud, massed artillery bombardments and lack of food and water; rapid relief of units spread the exhaustion through all the infantry, despite fresh divisions taking over. The Fifth Army bombarded the German defences from Polygon Wood to Langemarck but the German guns concentrated their fire on the Plateau. Low cloud and rain grounded British artillery-observation aircraft and many shells were wasted. The 25th Division, 18th (Eastern) Division and the German 54th Division had taken over by 4 August but the German 52nd Reserve Division was left in line; by zero hour on 10 August, both sides were exhausted. Some troops of the 18th (Eastern) Division quickly reached their objectives but German artillery isolated those around Inverness Copse and Glencorse Wood. German counter-attacks recaptured the Copse and all but the north-west corner of Glencorse Wood by nightfall. The 25th Division on the left reached its objectives by 5:30 a.m. and rushed the Germans in Westhoek. Both sides suffered many casualties during artillery bombardments and German counter-attacks.

=== Northern flank ===
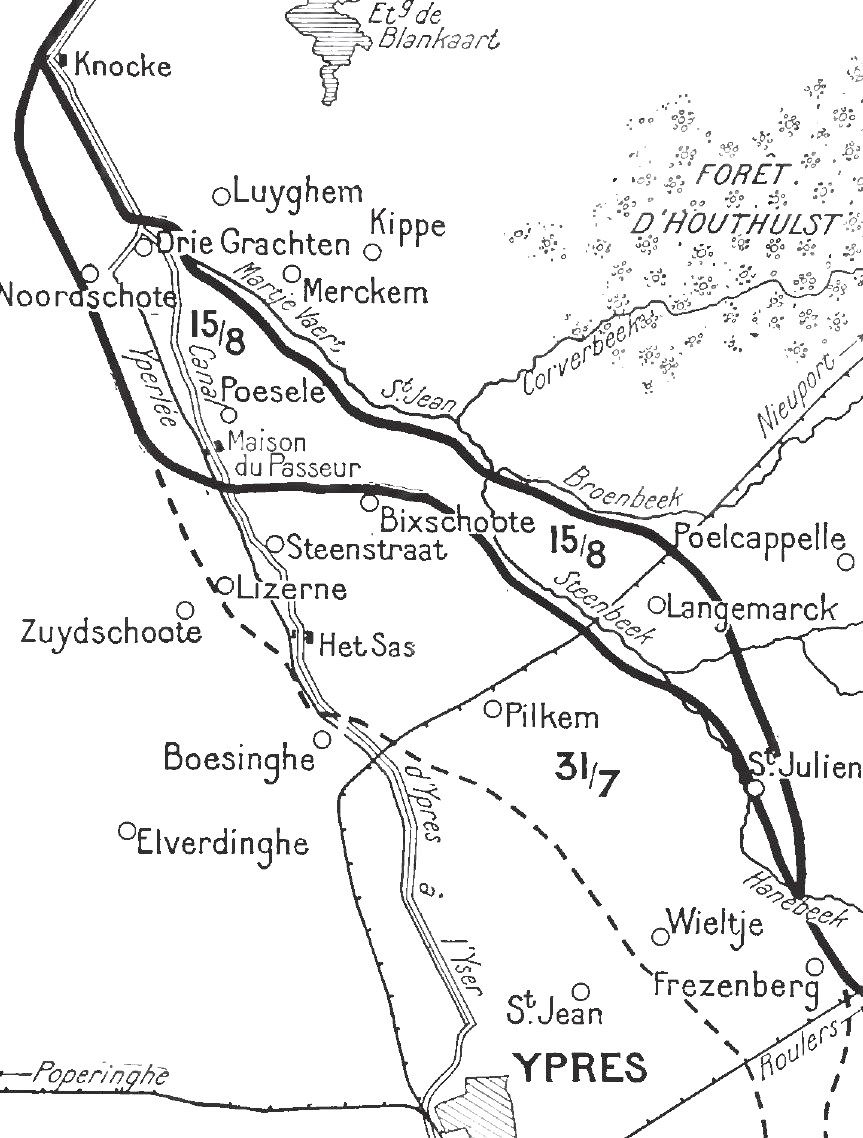
Dashed line: northern flank, morning 31 July; first black line: front line, evening 31 July

The French 1st and 51st divisions had suffered relatively few casualties and Lacapelle ordered them to continue their attacks up to the Steenbeek. On 4 August, amidst a downpour, the French edged forward of Kortekeer Cabaret to the south-east of Bixschoote and took two farms west of the Steenstraat–Woumen road. During 8 and 9 August the French took more ground to the north-west of Bixschoote. On 6 August, Lecappelle directed I Corps to drive out the Germans from their remaining positions west of the Martjewaart and establish good defensive positions from Poesele, along the Martjewaart inundations southwards past fermes General and Loobeek, to point 55.99 and on the south bank of the Steenbeek. From 4 to 6 August, the 1st and 51st divisions were relieved by the 2nd and 162nd divisions and from 7 August, I Corps held a line from ferme Sans-Nom to the Orchard, petite ferme and ferme 17. On 8 August ferme Loobeek was taken unopposed.

On 9 August, the French advanced closer to Langewaade, which appeared weakly held; the 2nd Division took fermes André Smits and Camellia. At dawn on 10 August, French Marines attacked over the drier ground in the Bixschoote area to gain more jumping-off points for an attack on Drie Grachten, north of the confluence of the Yser Canal and the Steenbeek. After an advance between the Yser Canal and the lower reaches of the Steenbeek, the west side of the inundations was occupied and bridgeheads were established across the Steenbeek. Five guns were captured and with the French close to Merckem and over the Steenbeek near St Janshoek, the German defences at Drie Grachten were outflanked from the south and Langemarck made vulnerable to attack from the north-west. By 10 August, the I Corps front ran from Kortekeer Cabaret, fermes du Jaloux, des Voltigeurs, Camélia, André Smits, the northern fringe of Bixschoote and fermes du Loobeek, du Bosquet, 16, 15 and 17.
