= Mountainman =

The Mountainman is a single stage mountain ultramarathon in Switzerland.

The distance is approximately 80 km, with a total elevation gain of 5.000 m. It is widely regarded as the most difficult foot race in Switzerland and belongs to the most difficult races in Europe.

For the first time, the race was held in late August 2010 by the Association BergArena" and held annually in August.

== Route ==
The route follows with a few exceptions along existing nature trails. The start is at Trübsee. The first ascent to the Joch Pass begins after about one kilometer. Then form Tannalp to Balmeregghorn and from there to the Berner Oberland and Planplatten, through the Halsiberg and from there down to the lowest point on the Brünig Pass followed by the steepest ascent up to Lungern Schönbüel. It then continues through to the final 30 km moorlands and the last ascent to Mount Pilatus.

=== Alternative competitions ===
It is also possible to participate on a shorter course or in a relay competition:

- "Mountainman Marathon": late entry, so only 42.195 kilometers and 2561 meters elevation
- "Mountainman Marathon 2x2": the shorter relay for two
- "Mountainman Ultra 2x2": the ultra-distance relay for two
- "Mountainman Ultra 4x4": the ultra-distance relay for four

== Rules ==
The regulations are developed according to the regulations of the Ultra-Trail du Mont-Blanc. The Mountainman has its own ethics regulations and some equipment is mandatory throughout the race (backpack with band-aid, plasters, a long top and long pants, mobile phone).

== Statistics ==
So far the racing times from 2010 and 2011 are not really comparable, as the trail had been organized in the opposite direction in the first edition.

=== Winners' list ===
==== Mountainman Ultra ====
Year	Men	Time	Women	Time
2011	Hug Bernhard (SWI)	9:06:07	Anita Lehmann (SWI)	10:29:17
2010 (opposite direction)	Urs Jenzer (SWI)	08:23:05	Anita Lehmann (SWI)	09:45:52

==== Mountainman Marathon ====
Year	Men	Time	Women	Time
2011	Martin Schmid (SWI)	4:17:18	Stefanie Minnig(SWI)	5:10:49
2011	Martin Schmid (SWI)	4:17:18	Stefanie Minnig(SWI)	5:10:49

== Other ==
The event won the Prix Ecosport 2010 - Environmental Award for sporting events, awarded by the Swiss Olympic.
To participate in the Ultra-Trail du Mont-Blanc the Mountainman ULTRA is awarded with three qualification points, the Mountainman Marathon with one qualification point (five points required).
