= Old Man of the Mountain (disambiguation) =

The Old Man of the Mountain is a rock formation and landmark in New Hampshire that collapsed in 2003.

Old Man of the Mountain may also refer to:

== People ==
- Old Man of the Mountain (Assassin), referring to
  - Hassan-i Sabbah (c. 1050–1124), founder of the Nizari Isma'ili state and its military group known as the Order of Assassins
  - Rashid ad-Din Sinan (c. 1134–1193), Nizari leader in Syria
- Brian Timmis (1899–1971), Canadian football player

== Film and television ==
- The Old Man of the Mountain (film), a 1933 Betty Boop cartoon
- "Old Man of the Mountain", Inspector Gadget season 1, episode 45 (1983)
- "Old Man of the Mountain", Mike Tyson Mysteries season 2, episode 5 (2015)
- "The Old Man of the Mountain", The Adventures of Rin-Tin-Tin season 3, episode 40 (1957)

== Other uses ==
- Hymenoxys grandiflora, an alpine sunflower in North America
- Oreocereus, a genus of cacti in South America

== See also ==
- Mountain Man (disambiguation)
