= Richard Oldman =

British Army officer

Major-General Richard Oldman CB CMG DSO
- Born: June 1877
- Died: 1943 (aged 65-66)
- Burial place: Crowthorne, Berkshire
- Military career
- Allegiance: United Kingdom
- Branch: British Army
- Rank: Major-General
- Unit: Norfolk Regiment
- Commands: 1st Battalion, Cheshire Regiment; 117th Infantry Brigade; 15th Infantry Brigade; 2nd Infantry Brigade; 6th Infantry Brigade; 47th (2nd London) Division
- Conflicts: First World War
- Awards: Companion of the Order of the Bath; Companion of the Order of St Michael and St George; Distinguished Service Order

Major-General Richard Deare Furley Oldman CB, CMG, DSO (June 1877 – 1943) was a British Army officer.

== Military career ==
Educated at Haileybury and the Royal Military College, Sandhurst, Oldman was commissioned into the Norfolk Regiment on 20 February 1897. He was promoted to lieutenant on 5 May 1898 although this was later antedated to 25 April 1898.

He saw action in operations in Northern Nigeria in 1903 and 1904 for which he was appointed a Companion of the Distinguished Service Order. He was promoted to captain on 25 February 1905.

He was promoted on 25 April 1915 to major, eight months after the British entry into World War I. He became commanding officer (CO) of the 1st Battalion, Cheshire Regiment, on the Western Front in 1915, commander of the 117th Infantry Brigade on the Western Front in 1916 and commander of the 15th Infantry Brigade on the Western Front in November 1917. He was wounded in May 1918 and gassed in June 1918.

After the war, he was promoted on 1 January 1919 to brevet colonel.

By now having transferred to the Wiltshire Regiment, he was promoted to colonel on 19 December 1923, with seniority dated back to 1 January 1919. On 1 January 1924 he was made inspector general of the West African Frontier Force (later the Royal West African Frontier Force) and was granted the temporary rank of colonel on the staff whilst employed in this role. He was commander of the 6th Infantry Brigade in October 1926 and was, on 1 July 1930, placed on half-pay.

He reverted to normal pay when he was assigned as general officer commanding (GOC) of the 47th (2nd London) Division, a Territorial Army (TA) formation, on 1 January 1931 He relinquished this appointment on 1 January 1935 When he retired from the army.

Military offices
Preceded by Louis Oldfield	GOC 47th (2nd London) Division; 1931–1934	Succeeded by Clive Liddell
