= Babushka Adoption Foundation =

Charitable non-governmental organization in Kyrgyzstan

Babushka Adoption Charitable Foundation
- ОБФ Бабушка Эдопшн
- Babushka Adoption logo
- Formation: 1999
- Founder: Markus Müller
- Headquarters: Moskovskaya 39-5
- Location: Bishkek, Kyrgyzstan
- Coordinates: 42.86931530000002°N 74.61870276011948°E
- Region served: Kyrgyzstan
- Director: Elena Yun
- Website: www.babushkaadoption.org

Babushka Adoption Foundation is a charitable non-governmental organization based in Bishkek, the capital city of Kyrgyzstan. It was founded in 1999. The foundation provide supports to elderly people in Kyrgyzstan who do not have any family members that can care for them. The term babushka is Russian for grandmother, though they also provide assistance to eldery men, dedushkas, as well.

== History ==
After the collapse of the Soviet Union in 1991, Kyrgyzstan, as well as other nations in Central Asia experienced economic hardship. Speaking in 2002, manager Xenia Kirsanova said "Since 1996 pensions have increased by 20 percent while public utility bills have grown by around 600 percent."

== Mission ==
In 1999, the Babushka Adoption project was established, with financial support of the Swiss Agency for Development and Cooperation to help the most vulnerable elderly in Kyrgyzstan. The foundation operates in Bishkek, the capital of Kyrgyzstan, and in Batken, the poorest region in the country. Donations come from abroad with sponsors located in Switzerland, the United States, France, Turkey and India. A donation of $10 a month through the foundation essentially doubled a pensioners' pension. In 2004, the project became an independent charity called the Babushka Adoption Charitable Foundation.

Whilst the United States Air Force had a presence in Manas Air Base, the Manas Area Benefit Outreach Society sponsored babushkas in the area through the foundation.
