= The Old Man (1931 film) =

1931 film

- Trade advertisement
- Directed by: Manning Haynes
- Written by: Edgar Wallace
- Based on: The Old Man by Edgar Wallace
- Produced by: S.W. Smith
- Starring: Maisie Gay; Anne Grey; Lester Matthews
- Cinematography: Alex Bryce
- Production company: British Lion Film Corporation
- Distributed by: British Lion Film Corporation
- Release date: 31 December 1931
- Running time: 77 minutes
- Country: United Kingdom
- Language: English

The Old Man is a 1931 British mystery film directed by Manning Haynes and starring Maisie Gay, Anne Grey and Lester Matthews. It was written by Edgar Wallace based on his 1931 play of the same name, with several actors reprising their roles. The film marked the screen debut of Scottish actor Finlay Currie.

== Plot ==
A mysterious figure known as 'The Old Man' returns a stolen cup to the safe at Lord Arranways' country mansion. Soon afterwards, the house burns down. Lord Arranways and his wife take refuge at the local inn run by John Lorney. Lord Arranways suspects his wife of conducting an affaire with adventurer Keith Keller. When Keller is subsequently the victim of a murder attack, Lorney is found to be the culprit, and is also revealed to be 'The Old Man'.

== Cast ==
- Maisie Gay as Mrs. Harris
- Anne Grey as Lady Arranways
- Lester Matthews as Keith Keller
- Cecil Humphreys as Lord Arranways
- D. A. Clarke-Smith as John Lorney
- Diana Beaumont as Millie Jeans
- Gerald Rawlinson as Dick Mayford
- Frank Stanmore as Charles
- Finlay Currie as Rennett

== Production ==
The film was shot at Beaconsfield Studios with sets designed by the art director Norman G. Arnold.

== Reception ==
Kine Weekly wrote: "Maisie Gay's part of Mrs. Harris has no bearing on the story whatsoever, but she plays it with such a strong sense of popular comedy that everything else is relegated to the background. She is the picture, and its undoubted success is due solely to her efforts. ... As a mystery thriller this picture is not in the first class, but as a Cockney comedy it contains everything that can be depended upon to delight the masses. The humour is definitely broad and occasionally borders on the vulgar, but it is so cleverly handled by the star that it is never offensive."

The Daily Film Renter wrote: "Edgar Wallace mystery thriller, ably directed by Manning Haynes, and vastly enriched by the brilliant Mrs. `Arris of Maisie Gay. It gives the public just what it wants, lots of laughter, mingled with a good story interest, and will be a riot in popular halls, and a box office tonic generally. ... Though Maisie Gay outshines them all, D. A. Clarke-Smith, Anne Grey, Cecil Humphries, and Lester Matthews all do good work, speaking, as well as acting, soundly, and being ably, photographed."

Picture Show wrote: "Edgar Wallace's thriller comes to the screen with Maisie Gay at her best. Thrills and laughter make this film of real entertainment value. Cecil Humphries (another well-known stage actor) and Anne Grey at their best."
