= Old Man River =

Old Man River may refer to:

- A personification of the Mississippi River in the United States
- Old Man River (musician) (born 1979), Israeli singer-songwriter
- "Ol' Man River", a 1927 song from the musical Show Boat
- "Old Man River (I've Come to Talk Again)", a song by Reba McEntire on the 1982 album Unlimited

== See also ==
- Oldman River
