= The Old Man (Wallace play) =

1931 British mystery play

- Original language: English
- Written by: Edgar Wallace
- Genre: Crime
- Setting: Coat of Arms tavern, England

Premiere
- Date: 15 May 1931
- Place: Wyndham's Theatre, London

The Old Man is a 1931 mystery play by the British writer Edgar Wallace. Its original production was staged at Wyndham's Theatre in London's West End for a ninety performance run. It is set entirely in the "Coat of Arms" tavern where a mysterious old man lurks in the background, reputedly an escapee from a lunatic asylum. The original cast included Alfred Drayton, Jack Melford, Harold Warrender and Finlay Currie.

== Film adaptation ==
The same year the play was adapted into the film The Old Man directed by Manning Haynes. Wallace was closely associated with British Lion, which produced the film.

== Bibliography ==
- Goble, Alan. The Complete Index to Literary Sources in Film. Walter de Gruyter, 1999.
- Kabatchnik, Amnon. Blood on the Stage, 1975-2000: Milestone Plays of Crime, Mystery, and Detection : an Annotated Repertoire. Rowman & Littlefield, 2012.
- Wearing, J. P. The London Stage 1930–1939: A Calendar of Productions, Performers, and Personnel. Rowman & Littlefield, 2014.
